This list of the Cenozoic life of Wyoming contains the various prehistoric life-forms whose fossilized remains have been reported from within the US state of Wyoming and are between 66 million and 10,000 years of age.

A

 †Aaptoryctes
 †Aaptoryctes ivyi
 †Absarokius
 †Absarokius abbotti
 †Absarokius gazini – type locality for species
 †Absarokius metoecus – type locality for species
 †Abuta – or unidentified related form
 †Acacia
 †Acacia lamarensis
 †Acacia macrosperma
 †Acacia wardii
 †Acarictis
 †Acarictis ryani – type locality for species
 Accipiter
  Accipiter gentilis
 †Accipiter striatus
 Acer
 †Acer lesquereuxi
 †Acer newberryi
 †Acer silberlingii
 †Acer vivarium
 †Aceroryctes – type locality for genus
 †Aceroryctes dulcis – type locality for species
 †Achaenodon
 †Achaenodon insolens – type locality for species
 †Achaenodon robustus – type locality for species
 †Acidomomys – type locality for genus
 †Acidomomys hebeticus – type locality for species
 †Acmeodon
 †Acmeodon secans
 †Acocephalus
 †Acocephalus adae – type locality for species
 †Acritoparamys
 †Acritoparamys atavus
 †Acritoparamys atwateri
 †Acritoparamys francesi
 †Acritoparamys wyomingensis
 Acrostichum
 †Acrostichum hesperium
 †Adilophontes – type locality for genus
 †Adilophontes brachykolos – type locality for species
 †Adjidaumo
 †Adjidaumo burkei – tentative report
 †Adjidaumo craigi – or unidentified comparable form
 †Adjidaumo minimus
 †Adocus
 †Adunator
 †Adunator fredericki
 †Adunator ladae
 †Adunator martinezi
 Aegialia
 †Aegialia rupta – type locality for species
 Aegolius
 †Aegolius acadicus
 Aegolius funereus
  †Aepycamelus
 †Aerugoamnis – type locality for genus
 †Aerugoamnis paulus – type locality for species
 †Aesculus
 †Aesculus antiquorum
 †Aesculus hickeyi
 †Afairiguana – type locality for genus
 †Afairiguana avius – type locality for species
 †Ageina
 †Ageina tobieni
 †Ageitodendron
 †Ageitodendron matthewi
 Agelaius
 †Agelaius phoeniceus
 †Agnotocastor
 †Agnotocastor galushai – type locality for species
  †Agriochoerus
 †Agriochoerus maximus
 †Agriochoerus minimus – or unidentified comparable form
 Ailanthus
 †Ailanthus lesquereuxi
 †Alagomys
 †Alagomys russelli – type locality for species
 †Alastor
 †Alastor solidescens – type locality for species
 †Albertanella – or unidentified comparable form
 †Albertanella minuta
 Alces
 †Alces alces
 †Aletodon
 †Aletodon conardae – type locality for species
 †Aletodon gunnelli – type locality for species
 †Aletodon quadravus
  †Aletomeryx
 †Aletomeryx gracilis
 †Aletornis – type locality for genus
 †Aletornis bellus – type locality for species
 †Aletornis gracilis – type locality for species
 †Aletornis nobilis – type locality for species
 †Aletornis pernix – type locality for species
 †Aletornis venustus – type locality for species
 Aleurites
 †Aleurites glandulosa
 †Alismaphyllites
 †Alismaphyllites grandifolius
 †Allantodiopsis
 †Allantoidiopsis erosa
  †Allognathosuchus
 †Allognathosuchus heterodon
 †Allognathosuchus polyodon
 †Allognathosuchus wartheni – type locality for species
 †Allomys
 †Allomys cristabrevis
 †Allophylus
 †Allophylus flexifolia
 Alnus
 †Alphagaulus
 †Alphagaulus vetus
 †Alticonus
 †Alticonus gazini
 †Alveojunctus
 †Alveojunctus minutus
 †Alveugena
 †Alveugena carbonensis – type locality for species
 †Amaramnis
 †Amaramnis gregoryi – type locality for species
 †Ambloctonus
 †Ambloctonus major
 †Ambloctonus priscus – or unidentified comparable form
 †Ambloctonus sinosus
 †Ameiseophis
 †Ameiseophis robinsoni – type locality for species
 †Amelotabes – type locality for genus
 †Amelotabes simpsoni – type locality for species
  Amentotaxus
 †Amentotaxus campbelli
 Amia
 †Amia fragosa
 †Amitabha – type locality for genus
 †Amitabha urbsinterdictensis – type locality for species
 †Ampelopsis
 †Ampelopsis acerifolia
 †Amphechinus
 †Amphechinus ellicottae – type locality for species
 †Amphigyion
 †Amphigyion straitae
 †Amphilemur
 †Amphiplaga
 Amphiuma
 †Amphiuma jepseni – type locality for species
 †Ampliconus
 †Ampliconus antoni – type locality for species
  Amyda
 †Amyda egregia – type locality for species
 †Amyda exquisita – type locality for species
 †Amyda mira – type locality for species
 †Amynodon
 †Amynodon advenus
 †Anacardites
 †Anacardites schinoloxus
 Anaclinia – tentative report
 †Anacodon
 †Anacodon nexus – type locality for species
 †Anacodon ursidens
 Anamirta – or unidentified comparable form
 †Anamirta milleri
 †Anaptomorphus
 †Anaptomorphus aemulus – type locality for species
 †Anaptomorphus westi – type locality for species
 Anas
 †Anas acuta
  Anas clypeata
 †Anas crecca
 Anas platyrhynchos
 †Anas schneideri – type locality for species
 †Anatella
 †Anatella tacita – type locality for species
 †Anconodon
 †Anconodon cochranensis
 †Anconodon gidleyi
 †Anemia
 †Anemia elongata
 †Anemorhysis
 †Anemorhysis natronensis – type locality for species
 †Anemorhysis pattersoni – type locality for species
 †Anemorhysis sublettensis – type locality for species
 †Anemorhysis wortmani – type locality for species
 †Anilioides
 †Anilioides nebraskensis
 †Anisonchus
 †Anisonchus sectorius
 †Anisonchus willeyi – type locality for species
 †Ankylodon
 †Ankylodon annectens – or unidentified comparable form
 †Anniealexandria – type locality for genus
 †Anniealexandria gansi – type locality for species
 Anobium
 †Anobium deceptum – type locality for species
 †Anobium lignitum – type locality for species
 †Anobium ovale – type locality for species
 †Anolbanolis – type locality for genus
 †Anolbanolis banalis – type locality for species
 †Anolbanolis geminus – type locality for species
 †Anomoemys
 †Anomoemys lewisi
  †Anosteira
 †Anosteira ornata
 †Anosteira radulina – type locality for species
 †Anosteira trionychoides
 †Antherophagus
 †Antherophagus priscus – type locality for species
 Anthonomus
 †Anthonomus revictus – type locality for species
 †Anthonomus soporus – type locality for species
 †Antiacodon
 †Antiacodon pygmaeus – type locality for species
 †Antiacodon vanvaleni – type locality for species
 †Antiacodon venustus – type locality for species
  Antilocapra
 †Antilocapra americana
 Apalone
 †Apalone extensa – type locality for species
 †Apalone heteroglypta – type locality for species
 †Apalone postera – type locality for species
 †Apatemys
 †Apatemys bellulus – type locality for species
 †Apatemys bellus
 †Apatemys chardini – or unidentified comparable form
 †Apatemys hendryi – type locality for species
 †Apatemys rodens
 †Aphaena
 †Aphaena rotundipennis – type locality for species
 †Apheliscus – type locality for genus
 †Apheliscus chydaeus – type locality for species
 †Apheliscus insidiosus
 †Apheliscus nitidus
 †Apheliscus wapitiensis – type locality for species
 †Aphelops
 †Aphelops megalodus
 †Aphronorus
 †Aphronorus fraudator
 †Aphronorus orieli – type locality for species
 †Aphronorus ratatoski – type locality for species
 †Apodosauriscus – type locality for genus
 †Apodosauriscus minutus – type locality for species
 †Apodosauriscus thermophilus – type locality for species
 †Apriculus
 †Apriculus praeteritus – type locality for species
 †Apternodus
 †Apternodus brevirostris – type locality for species
 †Apternodus dasophylakas – type locality for species
 †Apternodus gregoryi – type locality for species
 †Apternodus iliffensis
 †Apternodus major – type locality for species
 Aquila
 †Aquila antiqua – type locality for species
  Aquila chrysaetos
  Aralia
 †Aralia notata
 †Aralia serrulata
 †Aralia wrightii
 †Araliophyllum
 †Araliophyllum quina
 Araneus
 †Arapahovius
 †Arapahovius advena – type locality for species
 †Arapahovius gazini – type locality for species
 Araucaria
 †Araucaria longifolia
 †Archaeocyon
 †Archaeocyon falkenbachi
 †Archaeocyon leptodus
 †Archaeolagus
 †Archaeolagus emeraldensis
  †Archaeotherium
 †Archaeotherium minimus
 †Archaeotherium mortoni
 †Archaeotherium palustris – type locality for species
 †Archaerhineura – type locality for genus
 †Archaerhineura mephitis – type locality for species
 Arcoa
 †Arcoa lindgreni – type locality for species
 †Arctocyon
 †Arctocyon ferox
 †Arctocyon mumak
 †Arctodontomys
 †Arctodontomys nuptus
 †Arctodontomys simplicidens
 †Arctodontomys wilsoni – type locality for species
  †Arctodus
 †Arctodus simus
 †Arctostaphylos
 †Arctostaphylos elliptica
 †Arctostylops
 †Arctostylops steini
 †Arecipites
 †Arecipites tenuiexinous
 †Arenahippus
 †Arenahippus aemulor – type locality for species
 †Arenahippus pernix – type locality for species
 †Arfia
 †Arfia junnei
 †Arfia opisthotoma
 †Arfia shoshoniensis
 †Arfia zele – type locality for species
 Aristolochia
 †Aristolochia mortua
 †Armintodelphys
 †Armintodelphys blacki
 †Armintodelphys dawsoni
 †Armintomys
 †Armintomys tullbergi
 †Arpadosaurus – type locality for genus
 †Arpadosaurus gazinorum – type locality for species
 †Arpadosaurus sepulchralis – type locality for species
 †Artimonius
 †Artimonius nocerai
 †Artimonius witteri
 Artocarpus – tentative report
 †Artocarpus quercoides
 †Asarkina
 †Asarkina quadrata – type locality for species
 †Asiabradypus – or unidentified comparable form
 Asio
 †Asio flammeus
 Asio otus
 †Asplenium
 †Asplenium delicatula
 †Asplenium eoligniticum
 †Asplenium eolignitum
 †Asplenium erosum
 †Asplenium iddingsi
 †Asplenium remotidens
 †Astephus
 †Asterotrygon 
  †Asterotrygon maloneyi
 Astronium
 †Astronium truncatum
 †Athyana
 †Athyana balli
 †Aulolithomys
 †Aulolithomys bounites
 †Aulolithomys vexilliames – type locality for species
 †Auroralestes
 †Auroralestes simpsoni
 †Auxontodon
 †Averrhoites
 †Averrhoites affinis
 †Avunculus
 †Avunculus didelphodonti – or unidentified comparable form
 †Axestemys – type locality for genus
 †Axestemys byssina – type locality for species
 †Axestemys cerevisia – type locality for species
 †Axestemys salebrosa – type locality for species
 †Axestemys uintaensis – type locality for species
 †Aycrossia
 †Aycrossia lovei
 Aythya
 Aythya collaris
 Azolla
 †Azolla cretacea
 †Azygonyx
 †Azygonyx ancylion – type locality for species
 †Azygonyx grangeri
 †Azygonyx xenicus – type locality for species

B

 †Babibasiliscus – type locality for genus
 †Babibasiliscus alxi – type locality for species
 †Baena
 †Baena arenosa – type locality for species
 †Bahndwivici – type locality for genus
 †Bahndwivici ammoskius – type locality for species
 †Baioconodon
 †Baioconodon denverensis – or unidentified comparable form
 †Baioconodon middletoni – type locality for species
 †Baioconodon nordicus
 †Baioconodon wovokae
 †Baiotomeus
 †Baiotomeus douglassi
 †Baiotomeus lamberti
 †Baltemys – type locality for genus
 †Baltemys staurogastros – type locality for species
 †Baptemys
 †Baptemys wyomingensis – type locality for species
 †Barbouromeryx – or unidentified comparable form
  †Barylambda
 †Barylambda churchilli – type locality for species
 †Barylambda faberi
 †Bathornis
 †Bathornis fricki – type locality for species
 †Bathygenys
 †Bathygenys alpha
 †Bathygenys hedlundae
  †Bathyopsis
 †Bathyopsis fissidens
  †Batodonoides
 †Batodonoides vanhouteni – type locality for species
 †Batrachosauroides – tentative report
  Bauhinia
 †Bauhinia wyomingana
 †Bauhinia wyomingiana
  †Beilschmiedia
 †Beilschmiedia eocenica
 †Berchemiopsis
 †Berchemiopsis paucidentata
 †Beringiaphyllum
 †Beringiaphyllum cupanioides
 †Berosus
 †Berosus sexstriatus – type locality for species
 †Berosus tenuis – type locality for species
 †Bessoecetor
 †Bessoecetor septentrionalis
  Betula
 †Betula iddingsi
 †Betula stevensoni
 †Betula stevensonii
 Biomphalaria
 Bison
  †Bison bison
 †Bisonalveus – type locality for genus
 †Bisonalveus browni – type locality for species
 †Bisonalveus holtzmani – type locality for species
 †Blechnum
 †Blechnum anceps
 Bledius
 †Bledius adamus – type locality for species
 †Bledius faecorum – type locality for species
 †Blickomylus
 †Blickomylus galushai
  †Boavus – type locality for genus
 †Boavus brevis – type locality for species
 †Boavus idelmani – type locality for species
 †Boavus occidentalis – type locality for species
 Boletina
 †Boletina paludivaga – type locality for species
 †Boletina umbratica – type locality for species
 †Bootherium
  †Bootherium bombifrons
  †Borealosuchus
 †Borealosuchus formidabilis
 †Borealosuchus wilsoni – type locality for species
 †Botauroides – type locality for genus
 †Botauroides parvus – type locality for species
 †Bouromeryx
  †Boverisuchus
 †Boverisuchus vorax
  †Bownomomys – type locality for genus
 †Bownomomys americanus – type locality for species. Formerly known as Teilhardina americana.
 †Bownomomys crassidens – type locality for species. Formerly known as Teilhardina crassidens.
 †Boysia – or unidentified comparable form
 †Boysia phenacodorum
 †Brachianodon
 †Brachianodon westorum – type locality for species
  †Brachycrus
 †Brachycrus rusticus
 †Brachycrus sweetwaterensis
 †Brachycrus vaughani
 †Brachyerix
 †Brachyerix macrotis
 †Brachyhyops
 †Brachyhyops viensis
 †Brachyhyops wyomingensis – type locality for species
  †Brachyrhynchocyon
 †Brachyrhynchocyon dodgei
 †Brachyrhynchocyon intermedius
 †Brachyuranochampsa – type locality for genus
 †Brachyuranochampsa eversolei – type locality for species
 Bracon
 †Bracon laminarum – type locality for species
 Branta
  †Branta canadensis
 †Bridgeremys
 †Bridgeremys pusilla – type locality for species
 †Brontops
 †Browniea
 †Browniea serrata
 †Bryophyte – or unidentified related form
 Bubo
 †Bubo virginianus
 †Bunophorus
 †Bunophorus etsagicus
 †Bunophorus grangeri
 †Bunophorus macropternus
 †Bunophorus robustus
 †Bunophorus sinclairi – type locality for species
 †Bunrsera
 †Bunrsera inaequalateralis
 Buteo
 †Buteo jamaicensis
 †Buteo lagopus
 †Buteo regalis – or unidentified comparable form
  Buteogallus

C

 †Caedocyon
 †Caedocyon tedfordi – type locality for species
 †Caenolambda – type locality for genus
 †Caenolambda jepseni – type locality for species
 †Caenolambda pattersoni – type locality for species
  †Caenopus
 †Caenopus yoderensis – type locality for species
†Caesalpinia
 †Caesalpinia flumen-viridensis
 †Caesalpinia pecorae
 †Caesalpinites
 †Caesalpinites falcata – type locality for species
 †Calamagras
 †Calamagras angulatus – or unidentified comparable form
 †Calamagras platyspondyla
 †Calamagras primus – type locality for species
 †Calamagras weigeli
 †Calamospiza
†Calamospiza melanocorys
 †Calandrites
 †Calandrites cineratius
 †Calandrites defessus
 †Calcardea – type locality for genus
 †Calcardea junnei – type locality for species
 Calidris
  †Calidris melanotos
 †Callomyia
 †Callomyia torporata – type locality for species
 †Callospilopteron – type locality for genus
 †Callospilopteron ocellatum – type locality for species
 †Calycites
 †Calycites ardtunensis
 †Calycites hexaphylla
 †Calycites mikanoides
 †Calycites polysepala
 †Calycites RR58 informal
 †Calycites RR71 informal
  †Camelops
 †Camelops hesternus – or unidentified comparable form
 †Canarium
 †Canarium californicum
 †Canavalia
 †Canavalia diuturna
 Canis
  †Canis dirus
 †Canis latrans
 †Canis lupus
 †Cantius
 †Cantius abditus – type locality for species
 †Cantius frugivorus
 †Cantius mckennai
 †Cantius nunienus
 †Cantius ralstoni
 †Cantius simonsi – type locality for species
 †Cantius torresi
 †Cantius trigonodus – type locality for species
 †Capacikala
 †Capacikala parvus – type locality for species
 Capella
  †Capella gallinago
 †Carabites
 †Carabites kincaidi – type locality for species
 Caracara
  †Caracara plancus
 †Cardichelyon – type locality for genus
 †Cardichelyon rogerwoodi – type locality for species
 †Cardiolophus
 †Cardiolophus radinskyi – type locality for species
 †Cardiolophus semihians
 Cardiospermum
  †Cardiospermum coloradensis
  Carduelis
 †Carpites
 †Carpites newberryana
 †Carpites pedunculatus
 †Carpites verrucosus
 †Carpodaptes
 †Carpodaptes hazelae
 †Carpodaptes hobackensis
 †Carpodaptes jepseni
 †Carpodaptes rosei
 †Carpodaptes stonleyi
 †Carpolestes
 †Carpolestes dubius – type locality for species
 †Carpolestes nigridens
  †Carpolestes simpsoni – type locality for species
 †Carpolithes
 †Carpolithes osseus
  Carya
 †Carya antiquorum
 †Carya veripites
 †Carya viridifluminipites
 Castanea
 †Castanea intermedia
 †Castanea pulchella
 Castor
 †Castor peninsulatus
 †Catopsalis
 †Catopsalis alexanderi
 †Catopsalis calgariensis
  Cedrela
 †Cedrela trainii
 †Cedrelospermum
 †Cedrelospermum lineatum
 †Cedrelospermum nervosum
 †Cedrobaena – type locality for genus
 †Cedrobaena putorius
 †Cedrocherus
 †Cedrocherus aceratus – type locality for species
 †Cedrocherus ryani – type locality for species
 †Cedromus
 †Cedromus wardi
  †Celastrus
 †Celastrus culveri
 †Celastrus ellipticus
 †Celastrus inaequalis
 †Celastrus winchesteri
 †Celliforma
 †Celliforma spirifer
  Celtis
 †Celtis aspera
 †Celtis newberryi
 †Celtis peracuminata
 †Celtis phenacodorum
 †Centetodon
 †Centetodon bacchanalis
 †Centetodon bembicophagus
 †Centetodon chadronensis
 †Centetodon hendryi
 †Centetodon magnus
 †Centetodon marginalis
 †Centetodon neashami – type locality for species
 †Centetodon patratus
 †Centetodon pulcher
 †Centrinus
 †Centrinus diruptus – type locality for species
 †Centrocercus
  †Centrocercus urophasianus
 †Cephalogale
 †Ceratophyllum
 †Ceratophyllum muricatum
  †Ceratosuchus
 †Ceratosuchus burdoshi
  Cercidiphyllum
 †Cercidiphyllum arcticum
 †Cercidiphyllum articum
 †Cercidiphyllum BB21 informal
 †Cercidiphyllum BB34-52 informal
 †Cercidiphyllum genetrix
 †Cercidiphyllum tiny winged seeds informal
 †Cercidiphyllum tiny wingedseeds informal
  †Cercopis
 †Cercopis astricta – type locality for species
 †Cercopites – type locality for genus
 †Cercopites calliscens – type locality for species
 †Cercopites umbratilis – type locality for species
 †Ceutholestes
 †Ceutholestes dolosus
 †Chadrolagus
 †Chadrolagus emryi
 †Chaetoptelea
 †Chaetoptelea microphylla
 †Chaetoptelea pseudofulva – tentative report
 †Chalicomomys
 †Chalicomomys willwoodensis – type locality for species
 †Champsosaurus
 †Champsosaurus gigas
 †Chaneya
 †Chaneya tenuis
 Chara
 Charadrius
 †Charadrius montanus
 †Charadrius vociferus
 Charina
 †Charina prebottae
 Cheilosia
 †Cheilosia ampla – type locality for species
 †Cheilosia scudderi
 †Chelomophrynus – type locality for genus
 †Chelomophrynus bayi – type locality for species
 †Chilostigma – tentative report
 †Chilostigma ostracoderma
 †Chiromyoides
 †Chiromyoides caesor – type locality for species
 †Chiromyoides major – type locality for species
 †Chiromyoides minor – type locality for species
 †Chiromyoides potior
 Chironomus
 †Chironomus septus – type locality for species
  †Chisternon
 †Chisternon hebraicum – type locality for species
 †Chisternon undatum – type locality for species
 †Chlororhysis
 †Chlororhysis incomptus – type locality for species
 †Chlororhysis knightensis – type locality for species
 †Choctawius – or unidentified comparable form
 †Cholula
 †Cholula triguttata – type locality for species
 †Choragus
 †Choragus fictilis – type locality for species
 †Chordeiles
  †Chordeiles minor
 †Chriacus
 †Chriacus badgleyi
 †Chriacus baldwini
 †Chriacus gallinae
 †Chriacus katrinae
 †Chriacus oconostotae
 †Chriacus pelvidens
 †Chumashius
 †Cicadula
 †Cicadula saxosa – type locality for species
 †Cimolestes
 †Cinnamomophyllum
 †Cinnamomophyllum RR19 informal
  Cinnamomum
 †Cinnamomum sezannense
 †Cinnamomum spectabilis
 Circus
  †Circus cyaneus
 †Cissites
 †Cissites rocklandensis
  Cissus
 †Cissus haguei
 †Cissus marginata
 †Cissus marginatus
 †Cixius – tentative report
 †Cixius hesperidum – type locality for species
  Cladrastis
 †Cladrastis GR579 informal
 †Cladrastis GR580 informal
 †Claenodon
 †Claenodon montanensis
 †Cnemidaria
 †Cnemidaria magna
 †Coccothraustes
  †Coccothraustes vespertinus
  Cocculus
 †Cocculus flabella
 †Coelidia
 †Coelidia wyomingensis – type locality for species
 Colaptes
 †Colaptes auratus
 †Colodon
 †Colodon woodi
 †Colpocherus
 †Colpoclaenus
 †Colpoclaenus keeferi – type locality for species
 †Colpoclaenus procyonoides – or unidentified comparable form
 Colymbus
 †Colymbus nigricollis
 †Compsemys
 †Compsemys victa
 †Conacodon
 †Conacodon cophater – or unidentified comparable form
 †Conacodon delphae
  †Coniophis
 †Coniophis carinatus – type locality for species
 †Coniophis platycarinatus – type locality for species
 †Copecion
 †Copecion brachypternus
 †Copecion davisi
 †Copedelphys
 †Copedelphys stevensoni
 †Copelemur
 †Copelemur australotutus – type locality for species
 †Copelemur praetutus
 †Copelemur tutus
 †Copemys
 †Copemys longidens
 †Coriphagus
 †Coriphagus encinensis – or unidentified comparable form
 †Coriphagus montanus
  †Corizus – tentative report
 †Corizus guttatus – type locality for species
  †Cormocyon
 †Cormocyon haydeni
  Cornus
 †Cornus hyperborea
 †Cornus nebrascensis
 †Cornus newberryi
 †Cornus wrightii
 Corvus
 †Corvus brachyrhynchos
 †Corvus corax
 †Corylites
 †Corylites FW01 informal
 †Corylus
 †Corylus insignis
 †Corylus macquarryi
 Corymbites
 †Corymbites velatus – type locality for species
  †Coryphodon
 †Coryphodon armatus
 †Coryphodon eocaenus
 †Coryphodon lobatus
 †Coryphodon proterus
 †Coryphodon radians
 †Cranea
 †Cranea wyomingensis
 Crataegus
  †Credneria
 †Credneria daturaefolia – tentative report
 †Credneria pachyphylla
 †Cristadjidaumo
 †Cristadjidaumo skinneri – type locality for species
 Crocodylus
  †Crocodylus affinis – type locality for species
 †Crocodylus ziphodon – type locality for species
 †Cryptocephalus
 †Cryptocephalus vetustus – type locality for species
  Cryptorhynchus
 †Cryptorhynchus annosus – type locality for species
 Cryptotis
  Culex
 †Culex damnatorum – type locality for species
 †Cupanieidites
 †Cupanieidites inaequalis
 †Cupanieidites inaequatis
 †Cupidinimus
 †Cupidinimus whitlocki
 †Cycadopites
 †Cycadopites follicularis
 Cyclocarya
 †Cyclurus
 †Cyclurus fragosus
 †Cylindrodon
 †Cylindrodon natronensis – type locality for species
 †Cylindrodon solarborus – type locality for species
  †Cynarctoides
 †Cynarctoides acridens
 †Cynarctoides harlowi
 †Cynarctoides luskensis – type locality for species
 †Cyperacites
 †Cyperacites angustior
 †Cyperacites filiferus
 †Cyperacites giganteus
 †Cyriacotherium
 †Cyriacotherium argyreum – type locality for species
 †Cyriacotherium psamminum – type locality for species
 †Cyrilavis
 †Cyrilavis olsoni – type locality for species
 †Cyrtomenus
 †Cyrtomenus concinnus – type locality for species

D

 †Dalbergia
 †Daphoenictis
  †Daphoenodon
 †Daphoenodon falkenbachi – type locality for species
 †Daphoenodon niobrarensis
 †Daphoenodon skinneri – type locality for species
 †Daphoenodon superbus
  †Daphoenus
 †Daphoenus lambei
 †Dartonius
 †Dartonius jepseni
  Dasyatis
 †Davidia
 †Davidia antiqua
 †Dawsonicyon – type locality for genus
 †Dawsonicyon isami – type locality for species
 †Dawsonomys
 †Dawsonomys woodi
 †Dawsonophis – type locality for genus
 †Dawsonophis wyomingensis – type locality for species
 †Debeya
 †Decatoma
 †Decatoma antiqua – type locality for species
 †Delotrochanter
 †Delotrochanter major – type locality for species
 Dendragapus
  †Dendragapus obscurus
  †Dendropanax
 †Dendropanax latens
 †Dennstaedia
 †Dennstaedia americana
 †Dennstaedtia
 †Dennstaedtia americana
 †Dennstaedtiopsis
 †Dennstaedtiopsis aerenchymata
 †Desmatippus
 †Desmatippus tyleri
 †Desmatochoerus
 †Desmatochoerus hatcheri
 †Desmatochoerus megalodon
 †Desmatoclaenus
 †Desmatoclaenus mearae
 †Desmatolagus
 †Desmatolagus schizopetrus
 †Desmatotherium
 †Desmatotherium intermedius
 †Desmocyon
 †Desmocyon thomsoni
 †Devallia – tentative report
 †Devallia montana
 †Diacocherus
 †Diacocherus meizon – type locality for species
 †Diacocherus minutus
  †Diacodexis
 †Diacodexis ilicis
 †Diacodexis kelleyi
 †Diacodexis kellyi
 †Diacodexis metsiacus
 †Diacodexis minutus
 †Diacodexis primus
 †Diacodexis secans
 †Diacodexis woltonensis – type locality for species
 †Diacodon
 †Diacodon celatus
 †Diaplegma
 †Diaplegma obdormitum – type locality for species
  †Diatryma – type locality for genus
 †Diatryma gigantea – type locality for species
  †Diceratherium
 †Diceratherium annectens
 †Diceratherium armatum
 †Diceratherium tridactylum
 Dicotylophyllum
 †Dicotylophyllum anomalum
 †Dicotylophyllum mercerensis
  Dicranomyia
 †Dicranomyia primitiva
 †Dicranomyia rhodolitha – type locality for species
  Dicrostonyx
 †Didelphodontine
 †Didelphodus
 †Didelphodus absarokae
 †Didelphodus altidens
 †Didymictis
 †Didymictis altidens
 †Didymictis leptomylus
 †Didymictis protenus
 †Didymictis proteus
 †Didymictis vancleveae – or unidentified comparable form
 †Dillerlemur
 †Dillerlemur pagei
 †Dillerlemur robinettei – type locality for species
 †Dilophodon
 †Dilophodon destitutus – type locality for species
 †Dilophodon minusculus
  †Dinictis
 †Dinictis felina
  †Dinohyus
  †Diospyros
 †Diospyros brachysepala
 †Diospyros haguei
 †Diospyros lamarensis
 †Dipassalus
 †Dipassalus oryctes
 †Diplobunops
 †Diplobunops matthewi
  †Diplocynodon
 †Diplolophus
 †Diplolophus insolens – type locality for species
  †Diplomystus
 †Diplomystus dentatus
 †Dipoides
 †Dipoides stirtoni
 †Dipsalidictis
 †Dipsalidictis aequidens
 †Dipsalidictis krausei – type locality for species
 †Dipsalidictis platypus – type locality for species
 †Dipsalidictis transiens
 †Dipsalodon
 †Dipsalodon churchillorum
 †Dipsalodon matthewi – type locality for species
  Dipteronia
 †Dipteronia GR551 informal
 †Dipteronia insignis
 Discus
 †Dissacus
 †Dissacus argenteus – type locality for species
 †Dissacus longaevus
 †Dissacus navajovius
 †Dissacus praenuntius
  †Distylium
 †Distylium eocenica
 †Dithelysia
 †Dithelysia amorensis
  Dolichopus
  †Dombeya
 †Dombeya novimundi
 †Domnina
 †Domnina gradata – or unidentified comparable form
 †Domninoides
 †Domninoides valentinensis – or unidentified comparable form
 †Dorraletes
 †Dorraletes diminutivus
 †Douglassciurus
 †Douglassciurus jeffersoni
  †Drimys
 Dryocoetes
 †Dryocoetes carbonarius – type locality for species
 †Dryocoetes impressus
 †Dryomomys – type locality for genus
 †Dryomomys dulcifer – type locality for species
 †Dryomomys szalayi – type locality for species
  Dryopteris
 †Dryopteris lakesi
 †Dryopteris longipetiolatum
 †Dryopteris meeteetseana
 †Dryopteris serrata
 †Dryopteris weedii
 †Dryopteris xantholithensis
 †Dunnophis
 †Dunnophis microechinis – type locality for species
 †Dunnophis microechinus
 †Dysagrion – type locality for genus
 †Dysagrion fredericii – type locality for species
 †Dysagrion lakesii – type locality for species
 †Dysagrion packardii – type locality for species

E

  †Echmatemys
 †Echmatemys haydeni
 †Echmatemys lativertebralis
 †Echmatemys megaulax
 †Echmatemys rivalis – type locality for species
 †Echmatemys septaria
 †Echmatemys testudinea
 †Echmatemys wyomingensis
 †Eclytus
 †Eclytus lutatus – type locality for species
  †Ectocion
 †Ectocion cedrus – type locality for species
 †Ectocion collinus – type locality for species
 †Ectocion major – or unidentified comparable form
 †Ectocion mediotuber – type locality for species
 †Ectocion osbornianus
 †Ectocion parvus
 †Ectocion superstes
  †Ectoconus
 †Ectoconus cavigellii – type locality for species
 †Ectoconus ditrigonus
 †Ectoganus
 †Ectoganus bighornensis
 †Ectoganus copei
 †Ectoganus gliriformes
 †Ectoganus gliriformis
 †Ectoganus lobdelli
 †Ectopistes
  †Ectopistes migratorius
 †Ectopocynus
 †Ectopocynus antiquus – type locality for species
 †Ectopocynus intermedius – type locality for species
 †Ectypodus
 †Ectypodus aphronorus
 †Ectypodus childei – or unidentified comparable form
 †Ectypodus hazeni – type locality for species
 †Ectypodus laytoni – type locality for species
 †Ectypodus lovei
 †Ectypodus musculus
 †Ectypodus powelli – type locality for species
 †Ectypodus simpsoni
 †Ectypodus szalayi
 †Ectypodus tardus
  †Elaeodendron
 †Elaeodendron polymorphum
 †Ellipsodon
 †Ellipsodon lemuroides – or unidentified comparable form
 †Elphidotarsius
 †Elphidotarsius florencae – or unidentified comparable form
 †Elphidotarsius shotgunensis
 †Elpidophorus
 †Elpidophorus elegans
 †Elpidophorus minor – or unidentified comparable form
 †Elwynella – type locality for genus
 †Elwynella oreas – type locality for species
 †Enhydrocyon
 †Enhydrocyon basilatus
 †Enhydrocyon crassidens
 †Enhydrocyon pahinsintewakpa
  Enochrus
 †Enochrus primaevus – type locality for species
  †Entelodon
 †Entelodon coarctatus – or unidentified comparable form
 †Entomolestes – type locality for genus
 †Entomolestes grangeri – type locality for species
 †Entomolestes westgatei – type locality for species
 †Entomophontes – type locality for genus
 †Entomophontes hutchisoni – type locality for species
 †Entomophontes incrustatus – type locality for species
 †Entoptychus
  †Eobasileus
 †Eobasileus cornutus
 †Eobucco
 †Eobucco brodkorbi
 †Eocalopteryx
 †Eocalopteryx atavina – type locality for species
 †Eoceornis – type locality for genus
 †Eoceornis ardetta – type locality for species
 †Eoconodon
 †Eoconodon copanus
 †Eocrex – type locality for genus
 †Eocrex primus – type locality for species
 †Eodiploglossus – type locality for genus
 †Eodiploglossus borealis – type locality for species
 †Eoerianthus
 †Eoerianthus multispinosa
 †Eoformica
 †Eoformica pinguis – type locality for species
 †Eofringillirostrum – type locality for genus
 †Eofringillirostrum boudreauxi – type locality for species
 †Eoglyptosaurus
 †Eoglyptosaurus donohoei – type locality for species
 Eohiodon
  †Eohippus
 †Eohippus cristatus
 †Eoictops – type locality for genus
 †Eoictops novaceki – type locality for species
 †Eoliarus – tentative report
 †Eoliarus lutensis – type locality for species
 †Eomoropus
 †Eomoropus amarorum
 †Eomoropus anarsius
 †Eopodagrion – type locality for genus
 †Eopodagrion abortivum – type locality for species
 †Eopodagrion scudderi – type locality for species
 †Eorhinophrynus
 †Eorhinophrynus septentrionalis – type locality for species
 †Eoryctes – type locality for genus
 †Eoryctes melanus – type locality for species
 †Eostangeria
 †Eostangeria pseudopteris
 †Eostrix
 †Eostrix martinellii – type locality for species
  †Eotitanops
 †Eotitanops borealis
 †Eotylopus
 †Eotylopus reedi – type locality for species
 †Eozygodactylus – type locality for genus
 †Eozygodactylus americanus – type locality for species
 †Epicaerus
 †Epicaerus dilapsus – type locality for species
 †Epicaerus effossus – type locality for species
 †Epicaerus exanimis – type locality for species
 †Epicaerus fodinarum
 †Epicaerus saxatilis – type locality for species
 †Epicaerus subterraneus
 †Epicaerus terrosus – type locality for species
  †Epihippus
 †Epihippus gracilis
 †Epitriplopus
 †Epitriplopus uintensis
 †Epoicotherium
 †Epoicotherium unicum
  †Equisetum
 †Equisetum canaliculatum
 †Equisetum deciduum
 †Equisetum FW21 informal
 †Equisetum haguei
 Equus
  †Equus conversidens
 Eremophila
  †Eremophila alpestris
  Erythrina
 †Erythrina roanensis – type locality for species
  Esox
 †Esox kronneri – type locality for species
 †Esthonyx
 †Esthonyx acutidens
 †Esthonyx bisulcatus
 †Esthonyx gunnelli
 †Esthonyx spatularius
 †Eucastor
  †Eucommia
 †Eucommia serrata
 †Eudaemonema
 †Eudaemonema cuspidata
  Eugenia
 †Eugenia americana
 †Eugnamptus
 †Eugnamptus decemsatus – type locality for species
 †Eugnamptus grandaevus
 †Euhapsis
 †Euhapsis ellicottae
 †Eumys
 †Eumys elegans
 †Euparius
 †Euparius elusus – type locality for species
 †Euparius repertus – type locality for species
 Euphagus
  †Euphagus cyanocephalus
 †Euphagus magnirostris
 †Euproteaciphyllum
 †Euproteaciphyllum minutum
  †Eusmilus
 †Eusmilus sicarius
  Eutamias
 †Eutypomys
 †Eutypomys parvus
 †Exostinus
 †Exostinus lancensis – or unidentified comparable form

F

 Fagus
 †Fagus antipofii
 †Fagus undulata
 Falco
 †Falco columbarius
 †Falco falconella – type locality for species
  †Falco mexicanus
  †Falco rusticolus
 †Falco sparverius
 †Ficarasites – type locality for genus
 †Ficarasites stigmaticum – type locality for species
 Ficus
 †Ficus affinis
 †Ficus artocarpoides
 †Ficus asiminaefolia
 †Ficus deformata
 †Ficus densifolia
 †Ficus haguei
 †Ficus planicostata
 †Ficus shastensis – tentative report
 †Ficus subtruncata
 †Ficus tiliaefolia – tentative report
 †Ficus ungeri
 †Firmianites – type locality for genus
 †Firmianites aterrimus – type locality for species
 †Florentiamys
 †Florentiamys kinseyi – type locality for species
 †Florentiamys loomisi – type locality for species
  †Fluvioviridavis – type locality for genus
 †Fluvioviridavis platyrhamphus – type locality for species
 †Foekenia
 †Foekenia catenulata
 †Fortuna
 †Fortuna marsilioides – or unidentified comparable form
 †Franimys
 †Franimys ambos
 †Franimys amherstensis – type locality for species
 †Franimys buccatus
 †Fraxinoipollenis
 †Fraxinoipollenis variabilis
 †Fraxinoipollenites
 †Fraxinoipollenites pachyexinous
 †Fraxinoipollenites variabilis
 †Fraxinopollenites
 †Fraxinopollenites variabilis
  †Fraxinus
 †Fraxinus eocenica
 †Fraxinus eocinica
 †Fraxinus wrightii
  †Fulgora
 †Fulgora granulosa – type locality for species
 †Fulgora populata – type locality for species

G

 †Gagadon
 †Gagadon minimonstrum
 †Galbreathia
 †Galbreathia novellus
 †Galecyon
 †Galecyon mordax
  Galerita
 †Galerita marshii – type locality for species
  †Gallinuloides – type locality for genus
 †Gallinuloides wyomingensis – type locality for species
 Gastrocopta
 Gastrodonta
 †Gaultia – type locality for genus
 †Gaultia silvaticus – type locality for species
 †Gazinius
 †Gazinius amplus
 †Gazinius bowni – type locality for species
 †Gazinocyon
 †Gazinocyon vulpeculus
 †Gelastops
 †Gelastops joni – type locality for species
 †Gelastops parcus
 †Geranoides – type locality for genus
 †Geranoides jepseni – type locality for species
 †Geringophis
 †Geringophis depressus
  Gerrhonotus – or unidentified comparable form
 Ginkgo
  †Ginkgo adiantoides
 †Gleditsia – or unidentified related form
 †Gleditsia RR29 informal
 †Gleicheniidites
 †Glypta
 †Glypta transversalis – type locality for species
 †Glyptosaurus – type locality for genus
 †Glyptosaurus agmodon – type locality for species
 †Glyptosaurus obtusidens – type locality for species
 †Glyptosaurus rhodinos – type locality for species
 †Glyptosaurus sphenodon – type locality for species
 †Glyptosaurus sylvestris – type locality for species
 Glyptostrobus
  †Glyptostrobus europaeus
 †Glyptostrobus nordenskioldi
 †Goinophis – tentative report
 †Gomphochelys – type locality for genus
 †Gomphochelys nanus – type locality for species
 †Goniacodon
 †Goniacodon levisanus – type locality for species
 †Goniodontomys
 †Goniodontomys disjunctus
 Gopherus
 †Gopherus laticuneus
 †Gracilocyon
 †Gracilocyon rosei
 †Gracilocyon winkleri
 †Grangerella
 †Gregorymys
 †Gregorymys formosus
 †Gregorymys riggsi – type locality for species
 †Grewiopsis – tentative report
 †Grewiopsis aldersoni
 †Griphomys
 Grus
  †Grus canadensis
 †Grus marshi – type locality for species
 Gulo
  †Gulo gulo
 †Gymnetron
 †Gymnetron lecontei – type locality for species
 †Gymnocladus
 †Gymnocladus hesperia
 Gyraulus – or unidentified comparable form

H

 †Habrosaurus
 †Habrosaurus dilatus
 †Hadrianus
 †Hadrianus allabiatus – type locality for species
 †Hadrianus quadratus – type locality for species
 †Hammapteryx – type locality for genus
 †Hammapteryx reticulata – type locality for species
  †Hapalodectes
 †Hapalodectes anthracinus
 †Hapalodectes leptognathus
 †Hapalorestes
 †Hapalorestes lovei – type locality for species
 †Haplaletes
 †Haplaletes disceptatrix
 †Haplaletes pelicatus – type locality for species
 †Haploconus
 †Haplodontosaurus
 †Haplodontosaurus excedens
 †Haplolambda
 †Haplolambda quinni
 †Haplomylus
 †Haplomylus bozemanensis – type locality for species
 †Haplomylus palustris
 †Haplomylus scottianus – type locality for species
 †Haplomylus simpsoni
 †Haplomylus speirianus
 †Haplomylus zalmouti
  †Harpagolestes
 †Harpagolestes macrocephalus – type locality for species
 †Harpalodon
 †Harpalodon sylvestris – or unidentified comparable form
 †Harrymys
 †Harrymys irvini
 †Harrymys woodi
 †Helaletes – type locality for genus
 †Helaletes nanus – type locality for species
 †Heliscomys
 †Heliscomys hatcheri
 †Heliscomys mcgrewi
 †Heliscomys ostranderi
 †Heliscomys vetus – or unidentified comparable form
 †Helix
 †Helix evanstonensis
 †Helix sinclairi
  †Helodermoides
 †Helodermoides tuberculatus
 †Helohyus
 †Helohyus lentus
 †Helohyus milleri – type locality for species
 †Helohyus plicodon – type locality for species
 †Hemiacodon
 †Hemiacodon casamissus – type locality for species
 †Hemiacodon engardae – type locality for species
 †Hemiacodon gracilis
  †Hemiauchenia
 †Hemipsalodon
 †Hemipsalodon grandis
 Hemitelia
 †Hemitelia magna
 †Hemithlaeus
 †Hemithlaeus harbourae
 †Hemithlaeus josephi
 †Hendryomeryx
 †Hendryomeryx wilsoni
 †Heptacodon
  †Heptodon
 †Heptodon calciculus
 †Heptodon posticus
  †Herpetotherium
 †Herpetotherium innominatum – type locality for species
 †Herpetotherium knighti
 †Herpetotherium youngi – or unidentified comparable form
  †Hesperocyon
 †Hesperocyon gregarius
 †Hesperopetes
 †Hesperopetes thoringtoni – type locality for species
 †Hesperosorex
 †Hesperosorex lovei – type locality for species
 †Heteraletes
 †Heteraletes leotanus
 †Hexacodus
 †Hexacodus pelodes
 †Hexacodus uintensis
 †Hicoria
 †Hicoria antiqua
 †Hicoria crescentia
 †Hicoria culveri
 Hirundo – or unidentified comparable form
  †Hirundo pyrrhonota
  †Holospira
 †Homacodon
 †Homacodon vagans – type locality for species
 †Homalota
 †Homalota recisa – type locality for species
  †Homogalax
 †Homogalax protapirinus
 †Honrovits – type locality for genus
 †Honrovits tsuwape – type locality for species
  †Hoplophoneus
 †Hoplophoneus mentalis
 †Hoplophoneus primaevus
  †Hovenia
 †Hovenia oregonensis – or unidentified comparable form
 †Huerfanodon
 †Huerfanodon polecatensis – type locality for species
 †Hummelichelys
 †Hummelichelys annae – type locality for species
 †Hummelichelys ellipticus
 †Hummelichelys grangeri – type locality for species
 †Hummelichelys guttatus – type locality for species
 †Hutchemys
 †Hutchemys rememdium
  †Hyaenodon
 †Hyaenodon crucians
 †Hyaenodon horridus
 †Hyaenodon megaloides
 †Hyaenodon montanus
 †Hyaenodon mustelinus
 †Hyaenodon venturae
 †Hyaenodon vetus
  Hydrangea
 †Hydrangea antica
 †Hydrangea GR537 informal
 Hydrobia – report made of unidentified related form or using admittedly obsolete nomenclature
  Hydrobius
 †Hydrobius confixus – type locality for species
 †Hydrobius decineratus – type locality for species
 †Hydrochus
 †Hydrochus relictus – type locality for species
 †Hydromystria
 †Hydromystria expansa
 †Hylobius
 †Hylobius packardii – type locality for species
 †Hylobius provectus – type locality for species
  †Hyopsodus
 †Hyopsodus aemulor
 †Hyopsodus latidens
 †Hyopsodus lepidus – type locality for species
 †Hyopsodus loomisi
 †Hyopsodus lysitensis
 †Hyopsodus mentalis
 †Hyopsodus minor
 †Hyopsodus minusculus – type locality for species
 †Hyopsodus miticulus
 †Hyopsodus paulus – type locality for species
 †Hyopsodus pauxillus – type locality for species
 †Hyopsodus powellianus
 †Hyopsodus simplex
 †Hyopsodus tonksi – type locality for species
 †Hyopsodus uintensis
 †Hyopsodus walcottianus
 †Hyopsodus wortmani
  †Hypertragulus
 †Hypertragulus calcaratus
 †Hypisodus
 †Hypisodus alacer
 †Hypisodus minimus
  †Hypohippus
 †Hypohippus affinis
  †Hypolagus
 †Hypolagus parviplicatus – or unidentified comparable form
 †Hyporhina
 †Hyporhina tertia
 †Hypsiops
 †Hypsiops breviceps
  †Hyrachyus
 †Hyrachyus eximius
 †Hyrachyus modestus – type locality for species
  †Hyracodon
 †Hyracodon nebraskensis
 †Hyracodon petersoni
 †Hyracodon priscidens
  †Hyracotherium
 †Hyracotherium vasacciense

I

  †Icaronycteris – type locality for genus
 †Icaronycteris index – type locality for species
 †Ignacius
 †Ignacius clarkforkensis – type locality for species
 †Ignacius fremontensis
 †Ignacius frugivorus
 †Ignacius graybullianus
 †Iguanavus – type locality for genus
 †Iguanavus exilis – type locality for species
 †Indusia
 †Indusia calculosa – type locality for species
 †Insulapollenites
 †Insulapollenites leboensis
 †Insulapollenites rugulatus
 †Intyrictis
 †Intyrictis vanvaleni
 †Iridodon – type locality for genus
 †Iridodon datzae – type locality for species
 †Ischyromys
 †Ischyromys typus
 †Ischyromys veterior
 †Isectolophus
 †Isectolophus latidens
 †Isectolophus radinskyi – type locality for species
 †Isoetites
 †Isoetites horridus
 †Iulus
 †Iulus telluster – type locality for species

J

 †Jepsenella
 †Jepsenella praepropera
 †Jepsibaena
 †Jepsibaena minor – type locality for species
 †Joffrea
 †Joffrea BB20 informal
 †Joffrea FW50 informal
 †Judithemys
 †Judithemys backmani – or unidentified comparable form
 †Juglandicarya
 †Juglandiphyllites
 †Juglandiphyllites glabra
 Juglans
 †Juglans crescentia
 †Juglans laurifolia
 †Juglans rugosa
 †Juglans schimperi
  †Juncitarsus – type locality for genus
 †Juncitarsus gracillimus – type locality for species
 Junco – or unidentified comparable form
  †Junco hyemalis
 †Junglandaceae

K

 †Kalmia
 †Kalmia elliptica
  †Kalobatippus
 †Kalobatippus agatensis
 †Kalobatippus avus
  †Knightia
 †Knightia eocaena
 †Knightomys
 †Knightomys cremneus
 †Knightomys cuspidatus
 †Knightomys depressus
 †Knightomys huerfanensis
 †Knightomys minor
 †Knightomys senior
 Koelreuteria
 †Koelreuteria viridifluminis
 †Koniaryctes
 †Koniaryctes paulus – type locality for species
 †Kydia – or unidentified related form
 †Kydia FW61 informal

L

 †Labidolemur
 †Labidolemur kayi
 †Labidolemur major – type locality for species
 †Labidolemur serus
 †Labidolemur soricoides
 Laccobius
 †Laccobius elongatus – type locality for species
 †Laevigatosporites
  †Lagopus
 †Lagopus leucurus – or unidentified comparable form
 †Lambdotherium
 †Lambdotherium popoagicum
 †Lambertocyon
 †Lambertocyon eximius
 †Lambertocyon gingerichi – type locality for species
 Lanius
  †Lanius ludovicianus
  Larus – or unidentified comparable form
 †Lastrea
 †Lastrea goldiana
 Lathrobium
 †Lathrobium abscessum – type locality for species
 †Laurinoxylon
 †Laurinoxylon pulchellum
 †Laurophyllum
 †Laurophyllum caudatum
 †Laurophyllum perseanum
  Laurus
 †Laurus californica
 †Laurus grandis
 †Laurus montana
 †Laurus perdita
 †Laurus primigenia – tentative report
 †Laurus princeps
 †Laurus socialis
 †Leguminosites
 †Leguminosites coloradensis
 †Leguminosites lamarensis
 †Leguminosites lesquereuxiana
 †Leguminosites regularis – type locality for species
 Leiocephalus
 †Leipsanolestes
 †Leipsanolestes siegfriedti
  Lepisosteus
 †Lepisosteus glaber – or unidentified comparable form
 †Lepisosteus occidentalis
 †Leptacodon
 †Leptacodon donkroni
 †Leptacodon munusculum
 †Leptacodon packi – type locality for species
 †Leptacodon tener
 †Leptarctus – or unidentified comparable form
  †Leptauchenia
 †Leptauchenia decora
 †Leptauchenia major
  †Leptictis
 †Leptictis dakotensis
  †Leptocyon
 †Leptocyon gregorii
 †Leptolambda
 †Leptolambda schmidti
  †Leptomeryx
 †Leptomeryx esulcatus
 †Leptomeryx evansi
 †Leptomeryx mammifer
 †Leptomeryx semicinctus
 †Leptomeryx speciosus
 †Leptomeryx yoderi – type locality for species
 †Leptoreodon
 †Leptotomus
 †Leptotomus guildayi
 †Leptotomus parvus – type locality for species
 †Leptotragulus
 †Leptotragulus clarki – or unidentified comparable form
 †Leptotragulus medius
 †Leptotragulus ultimus
 Lepus
 Lepyrus – tentative report
 †Lepyrus evictus – type locality for species
 †Lestophis
 †Lestophis anceps – type locality for species
 †Lestophis crassus – type locality for species
 †Leucosticte
 †Leucosticte arctoa
 †Limaconyssus – type locality for genus
 †Limaconyssus habrus – type locality for species
 †Limalophus
 †Limalophus compositus
 †Limalophus contractus – type locality for species
  †Limnocyon
 †Limnocyon cuspidens – type locality for species
 †Limnocyon medius
 †Limnocyon potens – type locality for species
 †Limnocyon velox – type locality for species
 †Limnocyon verus – type locality for species
 †Limnoecus
  †Limnofregata – type locality for genus
 †Limnofregata azygosternon – type locality for species
 †Limnofregata hutchisoni – type locality for species
  Lindera
 †Lindera obtusata
 †Lindera varifolia – type locality for species
 †Lisserpeton
 †Lisserpeton bairdi
 †Listronotus
 †Listronotus muratus – type locality for species
 †Litaletes
 †Litaletes disjunctus
 †Litaletes ondolinde
 †Lithexorista – type locality for genus
 †Lithexorista scudderi – type locality for species
 †Lithohypoderma 
  †Lithohypoderma ascarides - type locality for species
 †Lithophis – type locality for genus
 †Lithophis sargenti – type locality for species
  †Lithophysa – type locality for genus
 †Lithophysa tumulta – type locality for species
 †Lithopsis – type locality for genus
 †Lithopsis elongata – type locality for species
 †Lithopsis fimbriata – type locality for species
  †Lithornis
 †Lithornis plebius – type locality for species
 †Lithornis promiscuus – type locality for species
 †Lithotorus – type locality for genus
 †Lithotorus cressoni – type locality for species
 †Litocherus
 †Litocherus lacunatus – type locality for species
 †Litocherus notissimus
 †Litocherus zygeus – type locality for species
 †Litolagus
 †Litolagus molidens
 †Litolestes
 †Litolestes ignotus – type locality for species
 †Litomylus
 †Litomylus dissentaneus – type locality for species
 †Litomylus ishami – type locality for species
 †Litomylus scaphicus – type locality for species
 †Litoyoderimys
 †Litoyoderimys auogoleus
 †Lophiotherium
 †Lophiotherium vasacciensis – type locality for species
 †Lophiparamys
 †Lophiparamys debequensis
 †Lophiparamys murinus
 †Lophiparamys woodi
 †Lophocion
 †Lophocion grangeri – type locality for species
 †Loveina – type locality for genus
 †Loveina minuta
 †Loveina sheai
 †Loveina wapitiensis
 †Loveina zephyri – type locality for species
 †Loxolophus
 †Loxolophus criswelli
 †Loxolophus faulkneri – type locality for species
 †Loxolophus hyattianus – or unidentified comparable form
 †Loxolophus priscus
 †Lucashyus – type locality for genus
 †Lucashyus coombsae – type locality for species
 †Lyctocoris – tentative report
 †Lyctocoris terreus – type locality for species
  Lygodium
 †Lygodium coloradense
 †Lygodium kaulfussi
 Lynx
  †Lynx lynx – tentative report
 †Lystra – tentative report
 †Lystra leei – type locality for species
 †Lystra richardsoni – type locality for species

M

 †Maceopolipollenites
 †Maceopolipollenites amplus
 †Maceopolipollenites leboensis
 †Maceopolipollenites rotundus
 †Maceopolipollenites tenuipolus
 †Maceopolipollenites triorbicularis
  †Macginitiea
 †Macginitiea gracilis
 †Macginitiea wyomingensis
  †Machaeroides
 †Machaeroides eothen
 †Machaeroides simpsoni – type locality for species
 †Machaerosaurus
 †Machaerosaurus torrejonensis
  Macrocranion
 †Macrocranion junnei – type locality for species
 †Macrocranion nitens
 †Macrocranion robinsoni
 †Macrotarsius
 †Macrotarsius siegerti – type locality for species
  Magnolia
 †Magnolia borealis
 †Magnolia californica
 †Magnolia culveri
 †Magnolia magnifica
 †Magnolia magnifolia
 †Magnolia microphylla
 †Magnolia pollardi
 †Magnolia spectabilis
 †Maiorana
 †Maiorana ferrisensis – type locality for species
 †Maiorana noctiluca
 †Malapoenna
 †Malapoenna cuneata
 †Malapoenna lamarensis
 †Malaquiferus
 †Malaquiferus tourteloti – type locality for species
 †Malfelis – type locality for genus
 †Malfelis badwaterensis – type locality for species
 †Mammacyon
 †Mammacyon ferocior – type locality for species
 †Mammuthus
  †Mammuthus columbi
  Marmota
 †Marsholestes
 †Marsholestes dasypelix – type locality for species
 †Mattimys
 †Mattimys kalicola
  †Megacerops
 †Megacerops osborni – type locality for species
 †Megadelphus
 †Megadelphus lundeliusi
 †Megalagus
 †Megalagus brachyodon
 †Megalagus primitivus
 †Megalagus turgidus
 †Megalesthonyx
 †Megalesthonyx hopsoni
  †Megalictis
 †Megalictis ferox
 †Megalictis petersoni
 †Melanosaurus – type locality for genus
 †Melanosaurus maximus – type locality for species
 †Melastomites
 †Melastomites montanensis
 †Meliakrouniomys
 †Meliakrouniomys skinneri
 †Meliosma
 †Meliosma flexuosa
 †Meliosma longifolia
  †Meniscotherium
 †Meniscotherium chamense
 †Meniscotherium priscum
 †Meniscotherium tapiacetum
 †Meniscotherium tapiacitum
 †Menisperimites
 †Menisperimites parvareolatus
 †Menispermites
 †Menispermites limacioides – type locality for species
 †Menispermites parvareolatus
  †Menoceras
 †Menoceras arikarense
 †Menoceras barbouri
 †Menops
 †Menops heloceras
 †Menops marshi – or unidentified comparable form
 †Mentoclaenodon
 †Mentoclaenodon acrogenius – type locality for species
 Mergus
 †Mergus merganser
  †Merychippus
 †Merychippus coloradense
 †Merychippus insignis – or unidentified comparable form
 †Merychippus primus
 †Merychyus
 †Merychyus arenarum
 †Merychyus crabilli
 †Merychyus elegans – or unidentified comparable form
 †Merychyus minimus
 †Merycobunodon – tentative report
 †Merycobunodon walshi – type locality for species
  †Merycochoerus
 †Merycochoerus chelydra
 †Merycochoerus magnus
 †Merycochoerus matthewi
  †Merycodus
 †Merycodus sabulonis – or unidentified comparable form
 †Merycodus warreni – or unidentified comparable form
 †Merycoides
 †Merycoides longiceps
 †Merycoides pariogonus
  †Merycoidodon
 †Merycoidodon culbertsoni – type locality for species
 †Merycoidodon major
 †Merycoidodon presidioensis – or unidentified comparable form
 †Mesatirhinus
 †Mesatirhinus megarhinus
 †Mesocyon – report made of unidentified related form or using admittedly obsolete nomenclature
 †Mesocyon temnodon
 †Mesodma
 †Mesodma ambigua – type locality for species
 †Mesodma formosa
 †Mesodma garfieldensis – or unidentified comparable form
 †Mesodma hensleighi
 †Mesodma pygmaea
  †Mesohippus
 †Mesohippus bairdi
 †Mesohippus westoni – or unidentified comparable form
 †Mesomeryx – or unidentified comparable form
 †Mesomeryx grangeri
  †Mesonyx
 †Mesonyx obtusidens – type locality for species
  †Mesoreodon
 †Mesoreodon chelonyx
 †Mesoreodon minor – type locality for species
 †Mesoscalops
 †Mesoscalops scopelotemos
  †Metacheiromys
 †Metacheiromys dasypus – type locality for species
 †Metacheiromys marshi – type locality for species
 †Metadjidaumo
 †Metadjidaumo hendryi – type locality for species
  †Metamynodon
 †Metamynodon planifrons – or unidentified comparable form
 †Metanoiamys
 †Metanoiamys paradoxus
 †Metarhinus
 Metasequoia
 †Metasequoia occidentalis
 †Metatomarctus
 †Metatomarctus canavus
  †Miacis
 †Miacis deutschi
 †Miacis exiguus
 †Miacis latidens
 †Miacis medius
 †Miacis parvivorus – type locality for species
 †Miacis petilus
 †Miacis vorax
 †Michenia
 Micrasema – tentative report
 †Micrasema tessellatum – type locality for species
 †Microclaenodon
 †Microclaenodon assurgens
 †Microcosmodon
 †Microcosmodon conus – type locality for species
 †Microcosmodon rosei – type locality for species
 †Micromomys
 †Micromomys antelucanus
 †Micromomys silvercouleei – type locality for species
 †Microparamys
 †Microparamys cheradius
 †Microparamys dubius
 †Microparamys hunterae
 †Microparamys minutus
  Microphysula – or unidentified comparable form
 †Micropternodus
 †Micropternodus borealis
 †Microsus
 †Microsus cuspidatus – type locality for species
 †Microsyops
 †Microsyops angustidens – type locality for species
 †Microsyops annectens
 †Microsyops cardiorestes
 †Microsyops elegans – type locality for species
 †Microsyops knightensis
 †Microsyops latidens
 †Microsyops scottianus
 Microtus
  †Microtus pennsylvanicus
 Mictomys
 †Mictomys vetus
 †Mimatuta
 †Mimatuta makpialutae
 †Mimatuta minuial – type locality for species
 †Mimetodon
 †Mimetodon churchilli – type locality for species
 †Mimetodon silberlingi
  †Mimoperadectes
 †Mimoperadectes houdei – type locality for species
 †Mimoperadectes labrus – type locality for species
 †Mimosites
 †Mimosites coloradensis
 †Mimotricentes
 †Mimotricentes fremontensis – type locality for species
  †Miniochoerus
 †Miniochoerus affinis – type locality for species
 †Miniochoerus chadronensis – type locality for species
 †Miniochoerus forsythae
 †Miniochoerus gracilis
 †Minippus
 †Minippus index
 †Mioclaenus
 †Mioclaenus opisthacus – or unidentified comparable form
 †Mioclaenus turgidus
 †Miocyon
 †Miocyon major – or unidentified comparable form
 †Mioheteromys
 †Mioheteromys amplissimus
  †Miohippus
 †Miohippus obliquidens
 †Miolabis
 †Miolabis fissidens
 †Miomustela
  †Mioplosus
 †Miospermophilus
 †Miospermophilus wyomingensis
 †Miotapirus
 †Miotapirus harrisonensis – type locality for species
 †Miotylopus
 †Miotylopus gibbi
 †Miotylopus leonardi
 †Miotylopus taylori – type locality for species
  †Miracinonyx
 †Miracinonyx studeri
 †Mithrandir
 †Mithrandir gillianus
 †Mitostylus
 †Mitostylus seculorum – type locality for species
 †Mixodectes
 †Mixodectes malaris
 Mnemosyne
 †Mnemosyne terrentula – type locality for species
 †Mojavemys
 †Mojavemys magnumarcus
 †Monosaulax
 †Monosaulax curtus – or unidentified comparable form
  †Moropus
 †Moropus hollandi
 Morus
 †Morus montanensis
 †Musophyllum
 †Musophyllum complicatum
 Mustela
 †Mustela americana
  †Mustela nigripes
 Mycetobia – tentative report
 †Mycetobia terricola – type locality for species
 †Mylanodon – type locality for genus
 †Mylanodon rosei – type locality for species
  Myrica
 †Myrica lamarensis
 †Myrica scottii
 †Myrica wardii
 †Myrmecoboides
 †Myrmecoboides montanensis
  Myrmica
 †Myrtophyllum
 †Myrtophyllum torreyi
 †Mysops
 †Mysops fraternus
 †Mysops minimus – type locality for species
 †Mysops parvus – type locality for species
 †Mytonolagus
 †Mytonolagus petersoni
 †Mytonolagus wyomingensis – type locality for species
 †Mytonomys
 †Mytonomys coloradensis
 †Mytonomys wortmani

N

 †Namatomys
 †Namatomys erythrus – type locality for species
 †Namatomys lloydi
 †Nannodectes
 †Nannodectes gazini – type locality for species
 †Nannodectes gidleyi
 †Nannodectes intermedius – type locality for species
 †Nannodectes simpsoni – type locality for species
 †Nanodelphys
 †Nanodelphys hunti
 †Nanomomys
 †Nanomomys thermophilus
 †Nanotragulus
 †Nanotragulus loomisi – type locality for species
 †Nanotragulus ordinatus
 †Naocephalus – type locality for genus
 †Naocephalus porrectus – type locality for species
 †Navajovius
 †Navajovius kohlhaasae
 †Neanis
 †Neanis schucherti
 †Necrocydnus
 †Necrocydnus gosiutensis – type locality for species
 †Necygonus – type locality for genus
 †Necygonus rotundatus – type locality for species
 †Nelumbago
 †Nelumbago montanum
  †Nelumbo
 †Neocathartes
 †Neocathartes grallator
 †Neodiacodexis
 †Neodiacodexis emryi
 †Neoliotomus
 †Neoliotomus conventus
 †Neoliotomus ultimus
  Neophrontops
 †Neophrontops americana
 †Neophrontops americanus
 †Neoplagiaulax
 †Neoplagiaulax grangeri – tentative report
 †Neoplagiaulax hunteri
 †Neoplagiaulax jepi – type locality for species
 †Neoplagiaulax mckennai – type locality for species
 †Neoplagiaulax nelsoni
 †Neothanes
 †Neothanes testeus – type locality for species
  Neotoma
 †Neovulpavus
 †Neovulpavus washakius
 †Nexuotapirus
 †Nexuotapirus marslandensis
 †Niglarodon
 †Niptomomys
 †Niptomomys doreenae
 †Niptomomys favorum – type locality for species
 †Niptomomys thelmae
 †Nonomys
 †Nonomys simplicidens
 †Nordenskioldia
 †Nordenskioldia borealis
 †Nosodendron
 †Nosodendron tritavum – type locality for species
 †Notharctus
 †Notharctus robinsoni – type locality for species
 †Notharctus robustior
  †Notharctus tenebrosus – type locality for species
 †Notharctus venticolus
  †Notogoneus
 †Notomorpha – type locality for genus
 †Notomorpha garmanii – type locality for species
 †Notomorpha gravis – type locality for species
 †Notomorpha testudinea – type locality for species
 †Notoparamys – tentative report
 †Notoparamys blochi – type locality for species
 †Nototamias – or unidentified comparable form
 †Nucifraga
  †Nucifraga columbiana
 Numenius
  †Numenius americanus
  †Numenius borealis
 †Nyctea
  †Nyctea scandiaca
 †Nyctitherium
 †Nyctitherium christopheri
 †Nyctitherium gunnelli – type locality for species
 †Nyctitherium serotinum – type locality for species
 †Nyctitherium velox
 †Nyssa
 †Nyssa alata
 †Nyssa borealis

O

 Ochotona
  †Ochotona princeps
  Ocotea
 †Ocotea coloradensis
 †Ocotea FW03 informal
 †Odaxosaurus
 †Odaxosaurus jepseni – or unidentified comparable form
 †Odaxosaurus piger
 †Ogmophis
 †Ogmophis microcompactus – or unidentified comparable form
 †Ogmophis voorhiesi
 †Oligodontosaurus – type locality for genus
 †Oligodontosaurus wyomingensis – type locality for species
 †Oligoryctes
 †Oligoryctes altitalonidus
 †Oligoryctes cameronensis
 †Oligoscalops – tentative report
 †Oligospermophilus
 †Oligotheriomys
 †Oligotheriomys senrudi
 †Oliveremys
 †Oliveremys uintaensis – type locality for species
 †Omalodiscus
 †Omomys
 †Omomys carteri
 †Omomys lloydi
  Ondatra
 †Ondatra meadensis
 †Onoclea
 †Onoclea hesperia
  †Onychonycteris – type locality for genus
 †Onychonycteris finneyi – type locality for species
 †Oodectes
 †Oodectes herpestoides – type locality for species
 †Oodectes jepseni
 Ophryastes
 †Ophryastes compactus – type locality for species
 †Opisthotriton
 †Opisthotriton kayi
  Oreamnos
 †Oreoconus
 †Oreodontoides
 †Oreodontoides oregonensis
  Oreohelix
 †Oreohelix megarche
 †Oreolagus
 †Oreolagus colteri
 †Oreolagus nebrascensis
 †Oreopanax
 †Oreopanax elongatum
 †Ormiscus
 †Ormiscus partitus – type locality for species
  †Orohippus
 †Orohippus major – type locality for species
 †Orohippus proteros
 †Orohippus pumilus – type locality for species
 †Orohippus sylvaticus
 †Orthogenysuchus – type locality for genus
 †Orthogenysuchus olseni – type locality for species
 †Osbornodon
 †Osbornodon brachypus – type locality for species
  †Osmanthus
 †Osmanthus praemissa
  †Osmunda
 †Osmunda affinis
 †Osmundacidites
 †Otarocyon
 †Otarocyon cooki
 †Otiorhynchites
 †Otiorhynchites fossilis – type locality for species
 †Otiorhynchites tysoni
 †Otiorhynchus
 †Otiorhynchus dubius – type locality for species
 †Otiorhynchus perditus – type locality for species
 †Ototriton – type locality for genus
 †Ototriton solidus – type locality for species
 †Ourayia
 †Ourayia hopsoni
 †Ourayia uintensis
 Ovis
  †Ovis canadensis
 †Oxyacodon
 †Oxyacodon agapetillus
 †Oxyacodon apiculatus
 †Oxyacodon priscilla
  †Oxyaena
 †Oxyaena forcipata
 †Oxyaena gulo
 †Oxyaena intermedia
 †Oxyaena lupina
 †Oxyclaenus
 †Oxyclaenus cuspidatus
  †Oxydactylus
 †Oxydactylus longipes – or unidentified comparable form
 †Oxydactylus lulli – type locality for species
 †Oxydactylus wyomingensis
 †Oxyprimus
 †Oxyprimus galadrielae – type locality for species
 †Oxyprimus putorius

P

  †Pachyaena
 †Pachyaena gigantea
 †Pachyaena gracilis
 †Pachyaena ossifraga
  Pachycondyla
 †Pachycondyla labandeirai – type locality for species
 †Pachylobius
 †Pachylobius compressus
 †Palaeanodon
 †Palaeanodon ignavus
 †Palaeanodon Ignavus
 †Palaeanodon nievelti
 †Palaeanodon parvulus – tentative report
 †Palaearctonyx
 †Palaearctonyx meadi – type locality for species
 †Palaechthon
 †Palaechthon alticuspis – or unidentified comparable form
 †Palaechthon woodi
 †Palaeictops
 †Palaeictops bicuspis
 †Palaeictops bridgeri
 †Palaeictops multicuspis
 †Palaeocarpinus
 †Palaeocarpinus aspinosa
 †Palaeocarya
 †Palaeocarya clarnensis
  †Palaeogale
 †Palaeogale sanguinarius
 †Palaeogale sectoria
  †Palaeolagus
 †Palaeolagus burkei
 †Palaeolagus haydeni
 †Palaeolagus hypsodus – type locality for species
 †Palaeolagus intermedius
 †Palaeolagus philoi
 †Palaeolagus primus – type locality for species
 †Palaeolagus temnodon
  †Palaeonictis
 †Palaeonictis occidentalis
 †Palaeonictis peloria – type locality for species
 †Palaeonictis wingi – type locality for species
 †Palaeophasianus – type locality for genus
 †Palaeophasianus meleagroides – type locality for species
 †Palaeorallus – type locality for genus
 †Palaeorallus troxelli – type locality for species
 †Palaeoryctes
 †Palaeoryctes cruoris – type locality for species
 †Palaeoryctes puercensis
 †Palaeoryctes punctatus
 †Palaeosinomenium – or unidentified comparable form
 †Palaeosinomenium venablesii
  †Palaeosinopa
 †Palaeosinopa didelphoides
 †Palaeosinopa dorri – type locality for species
 †Palaeosinopa incerta – type locality for species
 †Palaeosinopa lacus – type locality for species
 †Palaeosinopa lutreola
 †Palaeosinopa veterrima
  †Palaeosyops
 †Palaeosyops fontinalis
 †Palaeosyops paludosus – type locality for species
 †Palaeosyops robustus – type locality for species
 †Palaeotheca
 †Palaeotheca terrestris – type locality for species
 †Palaeoxantusia – type locality for genus
 †Palaeoxantusia amara – type locality for species
 †Palaeoxantusia fera – type locality for species
 †Palatobaena – type locality for genus
 †Palatobaena bairdi – type locality for species
 †Palatobaena gaffneyi – type locality for species
 †Palecphora
 †Palecphora patefacta – type locality for species
 †Palenochtha
 †Palenochtha minor
 †Palenochtha weissae – type locality for species
 †Paleoamphiuma – type locality for genus
 †Paleoamphiuma tetradactylum – type locality for species
 †Paleomyrtinaea
 †Paleomyrtinaea FW66 informal
 †Paleonelumbo
 †Paleonelumbo macroloba
 †Paleonuphar
 †Paleonuphar hesperium
 †Paleotomus
 †Paleotomus carbonensis – type locality for species
 †Paleotomus milleri – type locality for species
 †Paleotomus radagasti
 †Palepidophyma – type locality for genus
 †Palepidophyma lilliputiana – type locality for species
 †Palepidophyma paradisa – type locality for species
  Paliurus
 †Paliurus colombi
 †Palmocarpon
 †Palmocarpon subcylindricum
 †Pandaniidites
 †Pandaniidites radicus
 Panthera
  †Panthera leo
  †Pantolambda
 †Pantolambda cavirictus
 †Pantolambda intermedius – or unidentified comparable form
 †Pantolestes
 †Pantolestes longieundus – type locality for species
 †Pantolestes natans – or unidentified comparable form
 †Paracathartes
 †Paracathartes howardae
 †Paracosoryx
 †Paracosoryx wilsoni
 †Paracynarctus
 †Paracynarctus kelloggi
 †Paradjidaumo
 †Paradjidaumo hypsodus
 †Paradjidaumo trilophus
 †Paraenhydrocyon
 †Paraenhydrocyon josephi
 †Paraenhydrocyon robustus
 †Paraenhydrocyon wallovianus
 †Paraepicrates
 †Paraepicrates brevispondylus – type locality for species
 †Paraglyptosaurus
 †Paraglyptosaurus princeps – type locality for species
   †Parahippus
 †Parahippus pawniensis
 †Parahippus pristinus – tentative report
 †Parahippus wyomingensis – type locality for species
 †Paralatindia
 †Paralatindia saussurei – type locality for species
 †Paramerychyus
 †Paramerychyus harrisonensis
 †Paramerychyus relictus
 †Paramys
 †Paramys adamus – type locality for species
 †Paramys compressidens
 †Paramys copei
 †Paramys delicatior
 †Paramys delicatus
 †Paramys excavatus
 †Paramys leptodus
 †Paramys pycnus
 †Paramys relictus
 †Paramys taurus
 †Parandrita
 †Parandrita vestita – type locality for species
 †Paranolis – type locality for genus
 †Paranolis delicatus – type locality for species
 †Paranymphaea
 †Paranymphaea crassifolia
 †Paranymphea
 †Paranymphea crassifolia
 †Parapliosaccomys
 †Parapliosaccomys transversus
 †Paraprionosaurus – type locality for genus
 †Paraprionosaurus wyomingensis – type locality for species
 †Parapternodus
 †Parapternodus antiquus – type locality for species
 †Pararyctes
 †Pararyctes pattersoni – type locality for species
 †Parasauromalus – type locality for genus
 †Parasauromalus olseni – type locality for species
 †Paraternstroemia
 †Paraternstroemia hyphovenosa
 †Paratomarctus
 †Paratomarctus temerarius
  †Paratylopus
 †Paratylopus labiatus
 †Paratylopus primaevus
 †Parectypodus
 †Parectypodus clemensi
 †Parectypodus lunatus
 †Parectypodus sinclairi
 †Parectypodus sylviae
 †Pareumys
 †Pareumys grangeri
 †Parictis
 †Parictis dakotensis
 †Parictis gilpini
 †Parictis parvus
 †Parictis personi
 †Paromomys
 †Paromomys depressidens
 †Paromomys maturus
 †Parophisaurus
 †Parophisaurus pawneensis
 †Parvericius
 †Parvericius montanus
 †Parvileguminophyllum
 †Parvileguminophyllum coloradensis
 †Parvitragulus
 †Parvitragulus priscus
  †Patriofelis
 †Patriofelis ferox – type locality for species
 †Patriofelis ulta
 †Patriomanis
 †Patriomanis americanus
 †Pauromys
 †Pauromys schaubi – type locality for species
  †Peltosaurus
 †Pelycodus
 †Pelycomys
 †Pelycomys placidus
 †Penetrigonias
 †Penetrigonias dakotensis
 †Penosphyllum
 †Penosphyllum cordatum
 †Pentacemylus – tentative report
 †Pentacodon
 †Pentacosmodon
 †Pentacosmodon pronus – type locality for species
 †Peradectes
 †Peradectes californicus
 †Peradectes chesteri
 †Peradectes elegans – type locality for species
 †Peradectes protinnaminatus
 †Peradectes protinnominatus
  †Peratherium
 †Peratherium comstocki
 †Peratherium edwardi
 †Peratherium marsupium
 †Perchoerus
 †Perchoerus minor
 †Periptychus
 †Periptychus carinidens
 †Periptychus coarctatus
  Perognathus
 †Perognathus furlongi
  Peromyscus
  Persea
 †Persea brossiana
 †Persea coriacea – type locality for species
 †Persea pseudocarolinensis
 †Perseoxylon
 †Perseoxylon aromaticum
 †Persites
 †Persites argutus
 †Petauristodon
 †Phalaenoptilus
  †Phalaenoptilus nuttallii
  †Phareodus
 †Phareodus encaustus
 †Phareodus testis
  †Phenacocoelus
 †Phenacocoelus typus
 †Phenacodaptes
 †Phenacodaptes sabulosus – type locality for species
 †Phenacodontid
  †Phenacodus
 †Phenacodus bisonensis – type locality for species
 †Phenacodus grangeri
 †Phenacodus intermedius
 †Phenacodus magnus
 †Phenacodus matthewi
 †Phenacodus trilobatus
 †Phenacodus vortmani
 †Phenacolemur
 †Phenacolemur fortior – type locality for species
 †Phenacolemur mcgrewi – type locality for species
 †Phenacolemur praecox
 †Phenacolemur shifrae
 †Phenacolemur simonsi
 Phenacomys
 †Phenacomys longicaudus
 †Phenolia
 †Phenolia incapax – type locality for species
 Philhydrus
  †Philodendron – or unidentified related form
 †Philodendron RR61 informal
 †Philotrox
 †Philotrox condoni
  †Phlaocyon
 †Phlaocyon annectens
 †Phlaocyon leucosteus
 †Phlaocyon minor
 †Phlaocyon multicuspus
 †Phoebe
  Phragmites – tentative report
 †Phragmites latissima
 †Phyllites
 †Phyllites crassifolia
 †Phyllites demoresi
  Phyllobius
 †Phyllobius avus
  Physa
 Phytocrene
 †Phytocrene sordida
 Pica
  †Pica pica
 †Piceoerpeton – type locality for genus
 †Piceoerpeton willwoodense – type locality for species
 †Picrodus
 †Picrodus calgariensis
 †Picrodus canpacius
 †Picrodus silberlingi
 †Picromomys
 †Picromomys petersonorum – type locality for species
  Pinus
 †Pinus balli
 †Pinus florissanti
 †Pinus GR542 informal
 †Pinus gracilistrobus
 †Pinus iddingsi
 †Pinus Lesquereux
 †Pinus macrolepis
 †Pinus premurrayana
 †Pinus wardii
 †Pipestoneomys
 †Pipestoneomys bisulcatus – or unidentified comparable form
 Pipilo
  †Pipilo chlorurus
 †Plagioctenodon
 †Plagioctenodon krausae
 †Plagioctenodon rosei
 †Plagioctenodon savagei
 †Plagioctenodon thewisseni – type locality for species
 †Plagioctenoides
 †Plagioctenoides microlestes
 †Plagioctenoides tombowni
 †Plagiomene
 †Plagiomene accola
 †Plagiomene multicuspis
 †Planatus
 †Planatus raynoldsi
  †Planera
 †Planera longifolia
 †Planetetherium
 †Planetetherium mirabile
 †Planetochelys
 †Planetochelys dithyros
 †Planorbina
 †Planorbina pseudoammonius
 †Plastomenoides
 †Plastomenoides lamberti
 †Plastomenus
 †Plastomenus molopinus
 †Plastomenus oedemius – type locality for species
 †Plastomenus tantillus – type locality for species
 †Plastomenus thomasi
 †Plastomenus visendus – type locality for species
 †Plataninium
 †Plataninium haydeni
 †Platanophyllum
 †Platanophyllum whitneyi
  Platanus
 †Platanus brownii
 †Platanus GR552 informal
 †Platanus gracilis
 †Platanus guillelmae
 †Platanus montana
 †Platanus raynoldsi
 †Platanus raynoldsii
 †Platanus wyomingensis
  Platycarya
 †Platycarya americana
 †Platycarya BB09 informal
 †Platycarya castaneopis
 †Platycarya castaneopsis
 Platynus
 †Platynus caesus – type locality for species
 †Platynus senex – type locality for species
  Plecia
 †Plecia dejecta – type locality for species
 †Plecia pealei – type locality for species
  †Plesiadapis
 †Plesiadapis anceps – type locality for species
 †Plesiadapis churchilli
 †Plesiadapis cookei
 †Plesiadapis dubius
 †Plesiadapis fodinatus – type locality for species
 †Plesiadapis gingerichi
 †Plesiadapis praecursor
 †Plesiadapis rex
 †Plesiadapis simonsi – type locality for species
 †Plesiolestes
 †Plesiolestes problematicus – type locality for species
 †Pliophenacomys
 †Pliophenacomys meadensis
 †Pliophenacomys primaevus
 †Poabromylus
 †Poabromylus golzi
 †Poebrodon
  †Poebrotherium
 †Poebrotherium eximium
 †Poebrotherium wilsoni
 †Poliomyia – type locality for genus
 †Poliomyia recta – type locality for species
 †Pollyosbornia
 †Pollyosbornia altidens – or unidentified comparable form
  Polygyra
 †Pontifactor
 †Pontifactor bestiola – type locality for species
  Populus
 †Populus balsamoides
 †Populus cinnamomoides
 †Populus daphnogenoides
 †Populus FW60 informal
 †Populus glandulifera
 †Populus meigsii
 †Populus nebraskana
 †Populus speciosa
 †Populus vivaria
 †Populus wilmattae
 †Populus wyomingiana
 †Populus xantholithensis
 Porzana
  †Porzana carolina
  †Potamogeton
 †Premnoides
 †Premnoides douglassi
  †Presbyornis
 †Primobucco
 †Primobucco kistneri
 †Primobucco mcgrewi
 †Princetonia
 †Princetonia yalensis
  †Priscacara
 †Priscachara
 †Pristichampsus
 †Probathyopsis
 †Probathyopsis harrisorum
 †Probathyopsis lysitensis
 †Probathyopsis praecursor
 †Problastomeryx
 †Problastomeryx primus – type locality for species
 †Procaimanoidea
 †Procaimanoidea kayi – type locality for species
  †Procamelus
 †Procamelus grandis
 †Procerberus
 †Procerberus formicarum – or unidentified comparable form
 †Procerberus grandis – or unidentified comparable form
 †Prochetodon
 †Prochetodon cavus – type locality for species
 †Prochetodon foxi
 †Prochetodon taxus – type locality for species
 †Procydnus – tentative report
 †Procydnus mamillanus – type locality for species
 †Procynodictis
 †Procynodictis vulpiceps
 †Prodiacodon
 †Prodiacodon concordiarcensis – type locality for species
 †Prodiacodon furor – or unidentified comparable form
 †Prodiacodon puercensis – or unidentified comparable form
 †Prodiacodon tauricinerei
 †Proharrymys
 †Proharrymys schlaikjeri
 †Prolimnocyon
 †Prolimnocyon antiguus
 †Prolimnocyon antiquus
 †Prolimnocyon atavus
 †Prolimnocyon eerius
 †Prolimnocyon haematus – type locality for species
 †Promartes
 †Promartes lepidus
 †Promartes olcotti
 †Promartes vantasselensis
   †Promerycochoerus
 †Promerycochoerus carrikeri
 †Promerycochoerus superbus
 †Promioclaenus
 †Promioclaenus acolytus
 †Promioclaenus pipiringosi – type locality for species
 †Pronemobius
 †Pronemobius induratus – type locality for species
 †Pronemobius tertiarius – type locality for species
 †Pronothodectes
 †Pronothodectes jepi – type locality for species
 †Propalaeanodon – type locality for genus
 †Propalaeanodon schaffi – type locality for species
 †Proscalops
 †Proscalops miocaenus
 †Proscalops secundus – or unidentified comparable form
 †Prosciurus
 †Prosciurus vetustus
 †Protadjidaumo – tentative report
 †Protadjidaumo typus
 †Protagras – type locality for genus
 †Protagras lacustris – type locality for species
 †Protamphipteryx – type locality for genus
 †Protamphipteryx basalis – type locality for species
 †Prothryptacodon
 †Prothryptacodon furens
 †Prothryptacodon hilli – type locality for species
 †Protictis
 †Protictis agastor – type locality for species
 †Protictis aprophatos
 †Protictis haydenianus
 †Protictis microlestes
 †Protictis paralus
 †Protoboysia
 †Protoboysia complicata
  †Protoceras
 †Protoceras neatodelpha – type locality for species
 †Protochelydra
 †Protochelydra zangerli – or unidentified comparable form
 †Protochriacus
 †Protochriacus simplex – or unidentified comparable form
  †Protohippus
 †Protohippus perditus – or unidentified comparable form
 †Protolabis
 †Protolabis heterodontus – or unidentified comparable form
 †Protomarctus
 †Protomarctus optatus
 †Protopsalis
 †Protoptychus
 †Protoptychus hatcheri
 †Protoreodon
 †Protoreodon parvus – or unidentified comparable form
 †Protoreodon petersoni – or unidentified comparable form
 †Protoreodon pumilus
  †Protorohippus
 †Protorohippus montanum
 †Protorohippus venticolum
 †Protoselene – tentative report
 †Protoselene novissimus – type locality for species
 †Protospermophilus
 †Protospermophilus kelloggi
 †Protostrix
 †Protostrix leptosteus
 †Protostrix saurodosis – type locality for species
 †Prototomus
 †Prototomus deimos – type locality for species
 †Prototomus martis – type locality for species
 †Prototomus phobos
 †Prototomus robustus
 †Prototomus secundarius
 †Protungulatum
  †Protungulatum donnae
 †Protungulatum gorgun
 †Protungulatum sloani
  †Protylopus
 †Protylopus petersoni
 †Provaranosaurus – type locality for genus
 †Provaranosaurus acutus – type locality for species
 †Provaranosaurus fatuus – type locality for species
 †Proviverroides
 †Proviverroides piercei
 †Proxestops
 †Proxestops silberlingii – type locality for species
  Prunus
 †Prunus corrugis
 †Prunus stewarti
  †Pseudaelurus
 †Pseudaelurus intrepidus
  †Pseudhipparion
 †Pseudhipparion retrusum
 †Pseudoblastomeryx
 †Pseudoblastomeryx advena
 †Pseudocemophora
 †Pseudocemophora antiqua – or unidentified comparable form
  †Pseudocrypturus – type locality for genus
 †Pseudocrypturus cercanaxius – type locality for species
 †Pseudocylindrodon
 †Pseudocylindrodon medius
 †Pseudocylindrodon tobeyi
 †Pseudodesmatochoerus – type locality for genus
 †Pseudodesmatochoerus hoffmani – type locality for species
 †Pseudolabis
 †Pseudolabis dakotensis
 †Pseudopalaeocastor
 †Pseudopalaeocastor osmagnus
  †Pseudoprotoceras
 †Pseudoprotoceras longinaris
 †Pseudoprotoceras minor – type locality for species
 †Pseudoprotoceras taylori
 †Pseudotetonius
 †Pseudotetonius ambiguus
 †Pseudotheridomys
 †Pseudotheridomys pagei – or unidentified comparable form
 †Pseudotomus
 †Pseudotomus hians – type locality for species
 †Pseudotomus horribilis – type locality for species
 †Pseudotomus robustus – type locality for species
 †Psilosemys – type locality for genus
 †Psilosemys wyomingensis – type locality for species
  †Psilota
 †Psilota tabidosa – type locality for species
  †Psittacotherium
 †Psittacotherium multifragum
  Ptelea
 †Ptelea cassioides
  Pteris – or unidentified related form
 †Pteris silvicola
  Pterocarya
 †Pterocarya glabra
 †Pterocarya hispida
 †Pterocarya macginitii
 †Pteromogoplistes
 †Pteromogoplistes smithii – type locality for species
 †Pterospermites
 †Pterospermites haguei
   †Ptilodus
 †Ptilodus fractus
 †Ptilodus gnomus
 †Ptilodus kummae
 †Ptilodus mediaevus
 †Ptilodus montanus – or unidentified comparable form
 †Ptilodus tsosiensis – or unidentified comparable form
 †Ptilodus wyomingensis – type locality for species
 †Pulverflumen
 †Pulverflumen magnificum – type locality for species
 Puma
 †Puma concolor
  Pupilla – or unidentified comparable form
 †Pyramidula
 †Pyramidula ralstonensis
 †Pyrocyon
 †Pyrocyon dioctetus

Q

 †Quadratomus
 †Quadratomus grandis
 †Quadratomus grossus
 †Quadratomus sundelli
 †Quercinium
 †Quercinium knowltoni
 †Quercinium lamarense
  Quercus
 †Quercus consimilis – tentative report
 †Quercus culveri
 †Quercus cuneatus – type locality for species
 †Quercus drymeja
 †Quercus furcinervis
 †Quercus GR522 informal
 †Quercus GR575 informal
 †Quercus greenlandica
 †Quercus grosidentata
 †Quercus hesperia
 †Quercus magnifolia
 †Quercus olafseni
 †Quercus petros – type locality for species
 †Quercus sullyi
 †Quercus weedii
 †Quercus yanceyi
 †Quereuxia
 †Quereuxia angulata
  Quiscalus – or unidentified comparable form

R

  †Ramoceros
 †Rapamys
 †Rapamys wilsoni
 †Raphictis
 †Raphictis gausion – type locality for species
 †Reithroparamyine
 †Reithroparamys
 †Reithroparamys delicatissimus – type locality for species
 †Reithroparamys huerfanensis
 †Restes – type locality for genus
 †Restes rugosus – type locality for species
 †Reticuloidosporites
 †Reticuloidosporites pseudomurii
 †Rhamnacinium
 †Rhamnacinium radiatum
 †Rhamnus
 †Rhamnus cleburni
 †Rhamnus hirsuta
 †Rhamnus rectinervis
 Rhineura – type locality for genus
 †Rhineura hatcherii – type locality for species
 Rhinoclemmys – report made of unidentified related form or using admittedly obsolete nomenclature
 †Rhinoclemmys terrestris
 Rhus
 †Rhus mixta – tentative report
  †Rhus nigricans
 †Rhyssa
 †Rhyssa juvenis – type locality for species
  †Robinia
 †Robinia wardi
 Rosa
 †Rosa hilliae
 †Rymosia
 †Rymosia strangulata – type locality for species

S

  Sabal
 †Sabal grayana
 †Sabal powelli
 †Sabalitesamesoneuron
 †Sabalitesamesoneuron RR34 informal
 †Saccoloma
 †Saccoloma gardneri
 †Sackenia
 †Sackenia gibbosa – type locality for species
 †Salilx
 †Salilx longiacuminata
  Salix
 †Salix angusta
 †Salix aquilina
 †Salix cockerelli
 †Salix elongata – tentative report
 †Salix lavateri
 †Salix varians
 †Salpinctes – or unidentified comparable form
 †Salpinctes obsoletus
 †Salvinia
 †Salvinia preauriculata
 †Sanctimus
 †Sanctimus simonisi – type locality for species
 †Sanctimus stouti – type locality for species
 †Sanctimus stuartae
  †Saniwa – type locality for genus
 †Saniwa ensidens – type locality for species
 †Saniwa major – type locality for species
 †Saniwa stenodon
 †Sapindaceous
 †Sapindus
 †Sapindus alatus
 †Sapindus grandifolioloides
 †Sapindus grandifoliolus
 †Sapindus wardii
  Sassafras
 †Sassafras thermale
 †Scalopoides
 †Scapherpeton
 †Scapherpeton tectum
 †Scenopagus
 †Scenopagus curtidens
 †Scenopagus edenensis
 †Scenopagus hewettensis – type locality for species
 †Scenopagus priscus
 †Schaubeumys
 †Schaubeumys sabrae
 †Schizodontomys
 †Schizodontomys harkseni
 †Schizodontomys sulcidens
  †Schoepfia
 †Schoepfia republicensis
 Sciara
 †Sciara scopuli – type locality for species
 †Scincoideus
 †Scincoideus grassator – type locality for species
 Sciomyza – tentative report
 †Sciomyza disjecta – type locality for species
 †Sciomyza manca – type locality for species
 †Sciophila
 †Sciophila hyatti – type locality for species
 †Sciuravus
 †Sciuravus bridgeri – type locality for species
 †Sciuravus nitidus – type locality for species
 †Sciuravus popi – or unidentified comparable form
 †Sciuravus wilsoni
 †Scottimus
 †Scottimus ambiguus – or unidentified comparable form
 †Scottimus kellamorum – type locality for species
 †Scottimus viduus
 †Selenaletes
 †Selenaletes scopaeus
 Sequoia
 †Sequoia couttsiae
 †Sequoia langsdorfii
 †Sequoia magnifica
  †Sespia
 †Sespia nitida
 †Shoshonius
 †Shoshonius bowni
 †Shoshonius cooperi
  †Sialia
 †Sifrhippus
 †Sifrhippus grangeri
 †Sifrhippus sandrae
 †Sigynorum – type locality for genus
 †Sigynorum magnadivisus – type locality for species
  †Simoedosaurus
 †Simpsonictis
 †Simpsonictis jaynanneae – type locality for species
 †Simpsonictis pegus – type locality for species
 †Simpsonictis tenuis
 †Simpsonlemur
 †Simpsonlemur citatus
 †Simpsonlemur jepseni – or unidentified comparable form
 †Sinclairella
 †Sinomenium – or unidentified related form
 †Sinomenium RR08 informal
  †Sinopa
 †Sinopa agilis – type locality for species
 †Sinopa major – type locality for species
 †Sinopa minor
 †Sinopa rapax – type locality for species
 †Sinopa viverrinus
 †Siphonophoroides
 †Siphonophoroides antiqua – tentative report
  Siren
 †Siren dunni – type locality for species
  Sitona
 †Sitona grandaevus – type locality for species
 †Sitona paginarum
  Sloanea – or unidentified related form
 †Sloanea RR18 informal
  †Smilax
 †Smilax GR550 informal
 †Smilax lamarensis
  †Smilodectes
 †Smilodectes gibossus – type locality for species
 †Smilodectes gracilis – type locality for species
 †Smilodectes mcgrewi – type locality for species
 †Smilodectes sororis – type locality for species
 Sorex
 †Sorex hoyi
 †Sparganium
 †Sparganium stygium
 †Spathorhynchus – type locality for genus
 †Spathorhynchus fossorium – type locality for species
 †Spathorhynchus natronicus
 Spermophilus
 †Spermophilus primitivus
 †Spermophilus variegatus
 †Sphacorhysis
 †Sphacorhysis burntforkensis – type locality for species
  †Sphenocoelus
 †Sphenocoelus hyognathus
 †Sphenocoelus uintensis
 Spirodela
 †Spirodela magna
 †Spiza
 †Spiza americana
 †Spurimus
 †Spurimus scotti
 †Spurimus selbyi
 Stagnicola
 †Staphylinites
 †Staphylinites obsoletum – type locality for species
 †Stegobium
 †Stegobium defunctus – type locality for species
 †Steinius
 †Steinius annectens – type locality for species
 †Steinius vespertinus
  †Steneofiber
 †Steneofiber fossor
 †Steneofiber gradatus
 †Stenocinclis – type locality for genus
 †Stenocinclis anomala – type locality for species
 †Stenogomphus
 †Stenogomphus scudderi – type locality for species
  †Stenomylus
 †Stenomylus gracilis
 †Stenomylus hitchcocki
 †Stenomylus keelinensis
 †Stenopelta
 †Stenopelta punctulata – type locality for species
  Sterculia
 †Sterculia coloradensis
 †Stibarus
 †Stibarus quadricuspis
 †Stibarus yoderensis
 †Stillingia
 †Stillingia casca
 †Straitopollis
 †Straitopollis tectatus
 †Strigorhysis – type locality for genus
 †Strigorhysis bridgerensis – type locality for species
 †Strigorhysis rugosus
 Sturnella
  †Sturnella neglecta
 †Stygimys
 †Stygimys gratus
 †Stygimys kuszmauli
  †Stylemys
 †Stylemys nebrascensis
  †Stylinodon
 †Stylinodon mirus – type locality for species
  †Styrax
 †Styrax transversa
 †Subhyracodon
 †Subhyracodon mitis
 †Subhyracodon occidentalis
 Surnia
 †Surnia ulula
 †Suzanniwana – type locality for genus
 †Suzanniwana patriciana – type locality for species
 †Suzanniwana revenanta – type locality for species
 †Swaindelphys
 †Swaindelphys cifellii – type locality for species
 †Swainiguanoides – type locality for genus
 †Swainiguanoides milleri – type locality for species
 †Swartzia
 †Swartzia wardelii – type locality for species
 Sylvicola – type locality for genus
 †Sylvicola cadaver – type locality for species
  Sylvilagus
 Symplocos
 †Symplocos exilis
 Synaptomys
 †Syncolporites
 †Syncolporites minimus
  †Syndyoceras
 †Syndyoceras cooki
 †Syntomostylus
 †Syntomostylus fortis – type locality for species
 Syrphus
 †Systemodon
 †Systemodon tapirinus
 †Syzygioides
 †Syzygioides americana

T

 Tachycineta – or unidentified comparable form
  †Tachycineta bicolor
  †Taeniolabis
 †Taeniolabis taoensis
 †Talpavoides
 †Talpavoides dartoni – type locality for species
 †Talpavus
 †Talpavus duplus
 †Talpavus nitidus
 †Talpavus sullivani – type locality for species
 Tamias
 †Tamias ateles – or unidentified comparable form
 †Tanymykter
 †Tanymykter brachyodontus
  †Tapocyon
 †Tapocyon robustus – or unidentified comparable form
 †Tarka
 †Tarka stylifera
 †Tatmanius – type locality for genus
 †Tatmanius szalayi – type locality for species
 Taxidea
 †Taxidea taxus
 †Taxites
 †Taxites olriki
 Taxodium
 †Taxodium olriki
 †Taxodium olrikii
 †Taxonus
 †Taxonus nortoni – type locality for species
 †Taxymys
 †Taxymys lucaris
  †Teilhardina
 †Teilhardina americana – type locality for species. Late reclassified in the new genus Bownomomys as the species B. americanus.
 †Teilhardina brandti – type locality for species
 †Teilhardina crassidens – type locality for species. Later reclassified as Bownomomys crassidens.
 †Teilhardina demissa – type locality for species
 †Teilhardina gingerichi
 †Teilhardina mathewi
 †Teilhardina tenuicula
  †Teleoceras
  †Telmatherium
 †Telmatherium validum – or unidentified comparable form
 †Telmatherium validus – type locality for species
 †Telmatrechus
 †Telmatrechus parallelus – type locality for species
 †Temnocyon
 †Temnocyon macrogenys – type locality for species
 †Temnotrionyx – type locality for genus
 †Temnotrionyx manducans – type locality for species
 †Teretrum
 †Teretrum quiescitum – type locality for species
 †Ternstroemites
 †Ternstroemites aureavallis
 †Tetigonia
 †Tetigonia priscomarginata – type locality for species
 †Tetigonia priscovariegata – type locality for species
 †Tetonius
 †Tetonius matthewi – type locality for species
 †Tetonoides
 †Tetonoides pearcei
 †Tetraclaenodon
 †Tetraclaenodon puercensis
 †Tetrapassalus
 †Tetrapassalus proius – type locality for species
 †Thamnotettix
 †Thamnotettix gannetti – type locality for species
 †Thamnotettix mutilata – type locality for species
  Thelypteris
 †Thelypteris iddingsi
 †Thelypteris iddingsii
 †Thinocyon
 †Thisbemys
 †Thisbemys brevicrista
 †Thisbemys corrugatus – type locality for species
 †Thisbemys perditus
 †Thouinia
 †Thouinia eocenica
 †Thryptacodon
 †Thryptacodon antiquus
 †Thryptacodon australis
 †Thryptacodon barae
 †Thryptacodon orthogonius – type locality for species
 †Thryptacodon pseudarctos
 †Thuites
 †Thuites interruptus
  †Thuja
 †Thuja interrupta
 †Thuja interruptus
 †Thylacaelurus
 †Thylacaelurus montanus – or unidentified comparable form
 †Thylacodon
 †Thylacodon pusillus
  Tilia
 †Tilia populifolia
 †Tillodon
 †Tillodon fodiens – type locality for species
 †Tillomys
 †Tillomys parvidens – type locality for species
 †Tillomys senex
 †Tinimomys
 †Tinimomys graybulliensis
 †Tinimomys loomisi
 †Tinimomys tribos – type locality for species
 Tinosaurus – type locality for genus
 †Tinosaurus pristinus – type locality for species
 †Tinosaurus stenodon – type locality for species
  Tipula
 †Tipula sepulchri – type locality for species
 †Tipula spoliata – type locality for species
  †Titanoides
 †Titanoides gidleyi – type locality for species
 †Titanoides major
 †Titanoides nanus – type locality for species
 †Titanoides primaevus
 †Titanomyrma
  †Titanomyrma lubei – type locality for species
 †Torrejonia
 †Torrejonia sirokyi – type locality for species
 †Toxotherium
 †Toxotherium hunteri
 Trapa
 †Trapa angulata
 †Trapa paulula
 †Tremanotus
 †Tremanotus angustata
 †Triatriopollenites
 †Triatriopollenites granulatus
 †Triatriopollenites granulus
 †Tricalpites
 †Tricalpites parvus
 †Tricentes
 †Tricentes subtrigonus
 †Tricolpites
 †Tricolpites anguloluminosus + bathyreticulatus
 †Tricolpites anguloluminosus + bothyreticulatus
 †Tricolpites angulolumonosus + bathyreticulatus
 †Tricolpites mutabilis
 †Tricolpites parvus
 †Trigenicus
 †Trigenicus profectus
  †Trigonias
 †Trigonias osborni
 †Trigonorhinus
 †Trigonorhinus pristinus – type locality for species
 Trionyx
 †Trionyx concentricus – type locality for species
 †Trionyx thomasii – type locality for species
 †Triplopus
 †Triplopus cubitalis – type locality for species
 †Triplopus implicatus – type locality for species
 †Triplopus obliquidens – or unidentified comparable form
  †Tritemnodon
 †Tritemnodon strenuus
  †Tritoma
 †Tritoma binotata – type locality for species
  †Triumfetta
 †Triumfetta ovata
 †Trochodendroides
 †Trochodendroides flabella
 †Trogolemur
 †Trogolemur amplior – type locality for species
 †Trogolemur fragilis – type locality for species
 †Trogolemur myodes – type locality for species
  †Trogosus
 †Trogosus castoridens – type locality for species
 †Trogosus gazini – type locality for species
 †Trogosus latidens
 †Tropideres
 †Tropideres remotus – type locality for species
  †Tropisternus
 †Tropisternus saxialis – type locality for species
 †Tropisternus sculptilis – type locality for species
  †Trypodendron
 †Trypodendron impressus – type locality for species
 †Tsoabichi – type locality for genus
 †Tsoabichi greenriverensis – type locality for species
 †Tubulodon
 †Tubulodon atopum
 †Tubulodon pearcei
 †Tubulodon taylori
 †Tubulodon woodi
 Turdus – or unidentified comparable form
  †Turdus migratorius
 †Tuscahomys
 †Tuscahomys ctenodactylops – type locality for species
 †Tuscahomys major – or unidentified comparable form
 †Tuscahomys walshi – type locality for species
 †Tuscahomys worlandensis
 †Tylocephalonyx
 †Tylocephalonyx skinneri
 Tympanuchus
  †Tympanuchus phasianellus
 Typha – or unidentified related form
 †Tytthaena
 †Tytthaena lichna
 †Tytthaena parrisi – type locality for species

U

 †Uintaceras
 †Uintaceras radinskyi
 †Uintacyon
 †Uintacyon asodes
 †Uintacyon gingerichi
 †Uintacyon jugulans – type locality for species
 †Uintacyon massetericus
 †Uintacyon rudis
 †Uintanius
 †Uintanius ameghini
 †Uintanius rutherfurdi
 †Uintasorex
 †Uintasorex parvulus – type locality for species
  †Uintatherium – type locality for genus
 †Uintatherium anceps – type locality for species
 †Uintornis – type locality for genus
 †Uintornis lucaris – type locality for species
 †Uintornis marionae – type locality for species
  Ulmus
 †Ulmus microphylla
 †Ulmus minima – tentative report
 †Ulmus rhamnifolia
 Unio
 †Unuchinia
 †Unuchinia diaphanes – type locality for species
 †Unuchinia dysmathes
 Ursus
  †Ursus arctos
 †Ustatochoerus
 †Ustatochoerus medius
 †Utahia
 †Utahia carina – type locality for species
 †Utemylus
 †Utemylus serior – type locality for species

V

 †Valenia
 †Valenia wilsoni
 †Valenopsalis
 †Valenopsalis joyneri
 †Vassacyon
 †Vassacyon bowni – type locality for species
 †Vassacyon promicrodon
  †Vauquelinia
 †Vauquelinia comptonifolia
  †Viburnum
 †Viburnum antiquorum
 †Viburnum antiquum
 †Viburnum asperum
 †Vinea – or unidentified comparable form
 †Vinea pugetensis
  Vitis
 †Vitis olriki
 †"Vitis" stantoni
 †Viverravus
 †Viverravus acutus
 †Viverravus acutus/gracilis informal
 †Viverravus browni
 †Viverravus gracilis – type locality for species
 †Viverravus laytoni
 †Viverravus lutosus
 †Viverravus minutus – type locality for species
 †Viverravus politus
 †Viverravus rosei – type locality for species
 †Viverravus sicarius
  Viviparus
  †Vulpavus
 †Vulpavus australis
 †Vulpavus canavus
 †Vulpavus farsonensis – type locality for species
 †Vulpavus hargeri
 †Vulpavus ovatus – type locality for species
 †Vulpavus palustris – type locality for species
 †Vulpavus profectus – type locality for species
 †Vulpavus simplex
 Vulpes
  †Vulpes vulpes

W

 †Washakius
 †Washakius insignis
 †Washakius izetti
 †Wickia
 †Wickia brevirhinus – or unidentified comparable form
 †Wilsoneumys
 †Wilsoneumys planidens
  †Woodwardia
 †Woodwardia arctica
 †Woodwardia gravida
 †Woodwardia preareolata
 †Worlandia
 †Worlandia inusitata – type locality for species
 †Wrightohyus
 †Wrightohyus yatkolai
 †Wyolestes
 †Wyolestes apheles
 †Wyolestes dioctes – type locality for species
 †Wyomomys
 †Wyomomys bridgeri – type locality for species
 †Wyomylus – type locality for genus
 †Wyomylus whitei – type locality for species
 †Wyonycteris – type locality for genus
 †Wyonycteris chalix – type locality for species

X

 †Xanclomys
 †Xanclomys mcgrewi – type locality for species
 †Xenicohippus
 †Xenicohippus craspedotum
 †Xenicohippus grangeri
 †Xenochelys
 †Xenochelys bridgerensis – type locality for species
 †Xenochelys formosa
 †Xenochelys lostcabinensis – type locality for species
 †Xenocranium
 †Xestops
 †Xestops gracilis – type locality for species
 †Xestops lentus – type locality for species
 †Xestops microdus – type locality for species
 †Xestops minutus – type locality for species
 †Xestops piercei – type locality for species
 †Xestops savagei – type locality for species
 †Xestops vagans – type locality for species
 †Xestops vagrans
 †Xyronomys
 †Xyronomys swainae – type locality for species

Y

 †Yoderimys – type locality for genus
 †Yoderimys bumpi – type locality for species
 †Yoderimys stewarti
  †Ysengrinia
 †Ysengrinia americana

Z

 †Zamia
 †Zamia coloradensis
 †Zamia colorodensis
 †Zamia wyomingensis
 †Zangerlichelys
 †Zangerlichelys aequa
 †Zanycteris
 †Zanycteris paleocenus
 Zelkova
 †Zelkova nervosa
 †Zemiodontomys
 †Zemiodontomys burkei
 Zenaida
 †Zenaida rnacroura
 †Ziamys – or unidentified comparable form
 †Zingiberopsis
 †Zingiberopsis isonervosa
  Zizyphus
 †Zizyphus serrulatus
 †Zodiolestes
 Zonotrichia
  †Zonotrichia albicollis

References

 

Cenozoic
Wyoming